= Sridhara =

8th century Indian mathematician

Śrīdhara or Śrīdharācārya (8th–9th century) was an Indian mathematician, known for two extant treatises about arithmetic and practical mathematics, Pātīgaṇita and Pāṭīgaṇita-sāra, and a now-lost treatise about algebra, Bījagaṇita.

== Life ==
Very little is known about Śrīdhara's life beyond mentions of his mathematical work by later mathematicians and the content of his extant treatises, which do not contain biographical details such as his parents, teachers, or birthplace. Various scholars have suggested he came from the Bengal region or from South India. But at the end of his own composition Nyāyakaṇḍalī he mentions himself as a native resident of Bhurishreshtha village in Bengal, which is currently located in Hooghly district of West Bengal. His father's name was Baladev Acharya and his mother's name was Achhoka Devi. Based on example problems in his works mentioning Shiva, and a dedication in Pāṭīgaṇita-sāra, he was probably a Shaivite Hindu.

He was mentioned by Bhāskara II (12th century), and made apparent reference to Brahmagupta (7th century). Govindasvāmin (9th century) quoted a passage also found in Pāṭīgaṇita-sāra, and overlapping material is found in the work of Mahāvīra (9th century), from which historians estimate Śrīdhara to have lived in the 8th or early 9th century.

He has sometimes been conflated with other medieval Indian scholars also named Śrīdhara.

== Works ==
Śrīdhara wrote two extant mathematical treatises. The first, Pāṭīgaṇita, also called Bṛhat-Pāṭi ("Bigger Pāṭi") and Navaśatī ("Having 900"), extensively covered the practical mathematics of the time including arithmetic and mensuration (the part of geometry concerned with calculating sizes, lengths, areas, and volumes). It is believed to have originally included 900 stanzas, but only 251 are extant, and many topics mentioned in the table of contents have been lost. The second, Pāṭīgaṇita-sāra, also called Triśatikā ("Having 300") because it was written in three hundred verses, is an abridged summary of Pāṭīgaṇita. It discusses counting of numbers, natural number, zero, measures, multiplication, fraction, division, squares, cubes, rule of three, interest-calculation, joint business or partnership, and mensuration.

He also wrote a work on algebra, Bījagaṇita, which has been lost, but some quotations remain in the works of later mathematicians. Some historians believe that Śrīdhara may have authored another mathematical treatise called Gaṇita-pan̄caviṁśī.

His notable works include–

- He gave an exposition on the zero. He wrote, "If zero is added to any number, the sum is the same number; if zero is subtracted from any number, the number remains unchanged; if zero is multiplied by any number, the product is zero".
- In the case of dividing a fraction he has found out the method of multiplying the fraction by the reciprocal of the divisor.
- He presented a method of completing the square to solve quadratic equations, sometimes called Śrīdhara's method or the Hindu method. Because the quadratic formula can be derived by completing the square for a generic quadratic equation with symbolic coefficients, it is called Śrīdharācārya's formula in some places.

== Bibliography ==
- Datta, Bibhutibhusan (1932). "On the Relation of Mahāvīra to Śrīdhara". Isis. 17 (1): 25–33. JSTOR 224625.
- Hayashi, Takao (2002). "Shridhara". Encyclopaedia Britannica.
- Gupta, Radha Charan (1987). "On the Date of Śrīdhara". Gaṇita Bhāratī. 9 (1–4): 54–56. Reprinted in Ramasubramanian, K., ed. (2019). Gaṇitānanda. Springer. pp. 19–20. doi:10.1007/978-981-13-1229-8_4.
- Gupta, Radha Charan (2008). "Śrīdhara". In Selin, Helaine (ed.). Encyclopaedia of the History of Science, Technology, and Medicine in Non-Western Cultures (2nd ed.). Springer. pp. 2017–2018. doi:10.1007/978-1-4020-4425-0_9294.
- O'Connor, John J.; Robertson, Edmund F. (2000). "Sridhara". MacTutor History of Mathematics Archive. University of St Andrews.
- Pingree, David (1975). "Śrīdhara". In Gillispie, Charles C. (ed.). Dictionary of Scientific Biography. Vol. 12 (Rushd–Stas). New York: Scribner. pp. 597–598. ISBN 0-684-12924-8.
- Ramanujacharia, N.; Kaye, George R., eds. (1912–1913). "The Triśatikā of Śrīdharācārya". Bibliotheca Mathematica. Ser. 3. 13: 203–217.
- Sastri, S. Srikanta (1948). "The Date of Sridharacharya". The Jaina Antiquary. 13 (2): 12–17.
- Shukla, Kripa Shankar, ed. (1959). The Patiganita of Sridharacarya. Lucknow University.
- Singh, Sabal (1951). "Works of Śrīdharācārya". Annals of the Bhandarkar Oriental Research Institute. 32 (1–4): 254–257. JSTOR 41784594.
