= Kamalakara =

Indian mathematician and astronomer (1616–1700)

Kamalakara (1616 – 1700) was an Indian astronomer and mathematician. He came from a learned family of scholars from Golagrama, a village in Maharashtra State near Partha-puri (Pathari) on the northern bank of the river Godāvarī. His father, Nrsimha, was born in 1586. Two of Kamalakara's three brothers were also astronomers and mathematicians. Divakara, born in 1606, was the eldest of the brothers and Ranganatha was youngest. Kamalākara learnt astronomy from his elder brother Divākara, who compiled five works on astronomy. His family later moved to Vārāṇasī.

== Major works ==
Kamalākara's major work, "Siddhāntatattvaviveka", was compiled in Varanasi in about 1658, and was published by Sudhakar Dwivedi in the Vārāṇasī series. This work consists of 13 chapters in 3,024 verses. It deals with the topics of: units of time measurement, mean motions of the planets, true longitudes of the planets, the three problems of diurnal rotation, diameters and distances of the planets, the Earth's shadow, the Moon's crescent, risings and settings, syzygies, lunar and solar eclipses, planetary transits across the Sun's disk, the patas of the Moon and Sun; the "great problems", along with a conclusion. His other works include Śeṣavāsanā and Sauravāsanā. Kamalākara was bitterly opposed to Munishvara, the author of Siddhāntasārvabhauma.

It is wrongly believed by some modern sources that Kamalākara discovered that the pole star we see at present was not exactly at the pole. But this ideas was first expressed in Brahmanda Purana and Matsya Purana by sage Veda Vyasa: "uttAnapAda-putro-asau meDhibhooto dhruvo divi | sa hi bhraman bhtaamayate nityam chandraadityau grahaiH saha" (Uttanapada's son Dhruva is fixed like a pole in the Heaven, but it is moving itself and is making all the planets together with Sun and Moon move). Kamalākara's contribution was to rediscover this forgotten idea.

Contributions:

- He combined traditional Indian astronomy with Aristotelian physics and Ptolemaic astronomy as presented by Islamic scientists.
- In the third chapter of the Siddhanta-tattva-viveka Kamalakara used the addition and subtraction theorems for the sine and the cosine to give trigonometric formulae for the sines and cosines of double, triple, quadruple and quintuple angles. In particular he gives formulae for sin(A/2) and sin(A/4) in terms of sin(A) and iterative formulae for sin(A/3) and sin(A/5).
- According to David Pingree, he presents the only Sanskrit treatise on geometrical optics.
- He has assumed a value of 60 units for the radius of the Earth and gives values for sines at 1° intervals.
- Kamalākara also gives a table for finding the right ascension of a planet from its longitude

== Articles ==
- A K Bag, "Indian literature on mathematics during 1400–1800 A.D.", Indian J. Hist. Sci. 15 (1) (1980), 79–93.
- Radha Charan Gupta, "Kamalakara's mathematics and construction of Kundas", Ganita Bharati 20 (1–4) (1998), 8–24.
- Radha Charan Gupta, "Addition and subtraction theorems for the sine and the cosine in medieval India", Indian J. History Sci. 9 (2) (1974), 164–177.
- Radha Charan Gupta, "Sines and cosines of multiple arcs as given by Kamalakara", Indian J. History Sci. 9 (2) (1974), 143–150.
- Radha Charan Gupta, "Sines of sub-multiple arcs as found in the Siddhanta-tattva-viveka", Ranchi Univ. Math. J. 5 (1974), 21–27.
- David Pingree, "Islamic astronomy in Sanskrit", J. Hist. Arabic Sci. 2 (2) (1978), 315–330; 425.
- A N Singh, "Hindu trigonometry", Proc. Benares Math. Soc. 1 (1939), 77–92.

== See also ==
- Golagrama, village in India associated with astronomers and mathematicians
- Dadhigrama, village in India associated with astronomers and mathematicians
- Jambusagaranagara, region in India associated with astronomers and mathematicians
