= Pātīgaṇita =

Pātīgaṇita is the term used in pre-modern Indian mathematical literature to denote the area of mathematics dealing with arithmetic and mensuration. The term is a compound word formed by combining the words pātī and gaṇita. The former is a non-Sanskrit word meaning a "board" and the latter is a Sanskrit word meaning "science of calculation". Thus the term pātīgaṇita literally means the science of calculations which requires a board (on which dust or sand is spread out) for performing the calculations, or "board-computation" in short. The usage of the term became popular among authors of Indian mathematical works about the beginning of the seventh century CE. It may be noted that Brahmagupta (c. 598 – c. 668 CE) has not used this term. Instead, he uses the term dhūlīkarma (dhūlī is the Sanskrit term for dust). The terminology pātīgaṇita may be contrasted with "bījagaṇita" which denotes the area of mathematics referred to as algebra.

The term Pātīgaṇita is also the title of a work composed by Sridhara, an Indian mathematician who flourished during the 8th-9th century CE.

== Topics discussed in pātīgaṇita ==
According to Brahmagupta there are 20 operations (parikarma-s) and 8 determinations (also called logistics) (vyavahāra-s) that come under pātīgaṇita. He has stated as such in his Brahma-sphuṭa-siddhānta without specifying what these are. The commentators of Brahmasphuṭa-siddhānta have listed the following as the 20 operations and the 8 determinations.

=== Parikarma (Operations) ===
1. Samkalitam (addition)
2. Vyavakalitam (subtraction)
3. Guṇanam (multiplication)
4. Bhāgahārah (division)
5. Vargah (square)
6. Vargamūlam (square-root)
7. Ghanah (cube)
8. Ghanamnlam (cube root)
9. Computation of fractions of the form $(a/b)+(c/d)$
10. Computation of fractions of the form $(a/b)-(c/d)$
11. Computation of fractions of $a/b$ of $c/d$
12. Computation of fractions of the form $(a/b)+(c/d)$ of $e/f$
13. Computation of fractions of the form $(a/b)-(c/d)$ of $e/f$
14. Trairāsikam (the rule of three)
15. Vysta-trairāsikam (the inverse rule of three)
16. Pañca-rǎsikam (the rule of five)
17. Sapta-rāsrkam (the rule of seven)
18. Nava-rāsikam (the rule of nine)
19. Ekadasa-rāsikam (the rule of eleven)
20. Bhānda-pratibhāndam (barter and exchange)

=== Vyavahāra-s (determinations/logistics) ===
1. Miśrakah (mixture): Computations involving mixtures of several things.
2. Sreḍhi (progression or series): A sreḍhiis that which has a beginning (first term) and an increase (common difference).
3. Kṣetram (plane figures): Calculations of the area of a figure having several angles.
4. Khātam (excavation): Finding the volumes of excavations.
5. Citih (stock): Computing the measure of a pile of bricks.
6. Krākacikah (saw): Finding the measure of the timber sawn.
7. Rāśih (mound): Calculations to find the amount of a heap of grain, etc.
8. Chāyā (shadow): Finding the time from the shadow of a gnomon, etc.

== Works dealing with pāṭīgaṇita ==
The earliest work dealing with the topics that come under pāṭīgaṇita that has survived to the present day is the Bakhshali manuscript some portions of which has been carbon dated as 224–383 CE. The following are the currently available texts which deal arithmetic and mensuration. They may contain more material than the 20 operations and the eight determinations that are listed as the topics that come under pāṭīgaṇita.

1. Gaṇita-sāra-sañgraha of Mahavira (850 CE)
2. Pātīgaṇita and Pātīgaṇita-sāra (or Trisātikā) of Śrīdharācarya
3. Gaṇita-tilaka of Srīpati (1039 CE) (incomplete)
4. Līlāvatī of Bhāskara II (1150 CE)
5. Gaṇita-kaumudī of Nārāyaṇa (1356 CE)

In these works one can see references to several older works, but none of them have survived to the present day. The lost works include Pātīgaṇita of Lalla (8th century CE) and Govindakṛti of Govindasvāmi (9th century CE).

The following astronomical treatises deal with arithmetic and mensuration in one of the chapters:

1. Brahma-sphuṭa-siddhānta of Brahmagupta (628 CE) (the twelfth chapter, entitled Gaṇitāddhyāya)
2. Mahā-siddhānta of Āryabhaṭa II (c. 950 CE) (the fifteenth chapter, entitled Pātīgaṇita)
3. Siddhānta-sekhara of Śrīpati (1039 CE) (the thirteenth chapter, entitled Vyakta-gaṇitāddhyāya)

== Śrīdhara's Pāṭīgaṇita ==
In Indian mathematical literature, Śrīdhara is the only author who has composed a work titled Pāṭīgaṇita. He has composed another work titled Pāṭīgaṇita-sāra which is a short summary of his Pāṭīgaṇita. At the very beginning of the work, the author has listed the operations and the determinations that he is going to discuss in the work. According to Śrīdhara, there are 29 operations and nine determinations whereas Brahmagupta talks about only 20 operations and eight determinations. The operations specified in Śrīdhara's Pāṭīgaṇita are the following:

- The first eight operations specified by Brahmagupata
- These eight operations in respect of fractions
- Six operations involving reductions of fractions
- The five operations specified in items 12–17 in Brahmagupta's list
- Bhāṇḑa-pratibhāṇḍa (barter of commodities)
- Jīva-vikraya (sale of living beings)

The nine determinations specified by Śrīdhara are the eight determinations specified by Brahmagupta and śūnya-tatva (mathematics of zero).

Only one manuscript of Pāṭīgaṇita is currently available and it is incomplete. Discussions on some of the 29 operations and some of the nine determinations are missing from the extant manuscript.

== Full texts of Śrīdhara's works ==
- Full text of Śrīdhara's Pāṭīgaṇita is available in Internet Archive: Kripa Shankar Shukla (1959). The Patiganita of Sridharacharya with an ancient Sanskrit Commentary (with Introduction and English translation). Lucknow University: Department of Astronomy and Mathematics.
- Full text of Śrīdhara's Pāṭīgaṇita-sāra is available in Internet Archive: Sridhara (2004). Pati-ganita-sara (with translation and commentary in Hindi by Sdyumna Acarya). New Delhi: Central Sanskrit University.
