= Bījapallava =

Bījapallava (or Bījapallavaṃ) is a commentary in Sanskrit of Bhaskara II's Bījagaṇita composed by the 16th-17th century astrologer-mathematician Kṛṣṇa Daivajña. This work is also known by several other names: Kalpālatāvatāra, Bījānkura and Nāvāakura. A manuscript of the work, copied in 1601, has survived to the present day indicating that the work must have been composed earlier than 1601. The Bījapallava commentary is written in prose. Commentaries composed in prose, since they are not constrained by considerations of conforming to a particular meter, generally contain more information, more detailed explanations and often original material not found in the work on which the commentary is written. Bījapallava also follows this general pattern. T. Hayashi, a Japanese historian of Indian mathematics, in his forward to the critical edition of Bījapallava, writes:

". . . he [Kṛṣṇa Daivajña] goes on to discuss the mathematical contents in great detail, giving proofs (upapattis) for the rules and step-by-step solutions for the examples; but when the solution is easy, he merely refers to Bhaskara's auto-commentary. His discussions, often in the form of disputations between an imaginary opponent and himself, go deep into the nature of important mathematical concepts such as negative quantity, zero and unknown quantity, into the raison d'être of particular steps of the algorithms, and into various conditions for solubility of the mathematical problems treated in the Bijaganita."

The general style of the commentary can be summarized thus. For each stanza of the original text, the commentator gives explanations of the words used in the stanza, then the derivations of the word, synonyms and syntactic combinations of the word are given. He also gives alternate readings of the text and points out which one of them is preferable. What is of greatest interest to historians of mathematics is that he also gives detailed proofs of the rules enunciated in the original text and the detailed step-by-step solutions of the illustrative examples. This has helped translators of Bījagaṇita to understand the real import of the various rules stated therein. For example, H. T. Colebrooke while translating Bījagaṇita has extensively referred to Bījapallava seeking additional clarifications.

Though there are large number of commentaries on Bhāskara II's Līlāvatī, there are not many commentaries on his Bījagaṇita. In fact, chronologically, Bījapallava is the second known commentary on Bījagaṇita the first one being a commentary called Sūryaprakāśa composed by Sūryadāsa in 1538, a native of Parthapura. Even though Sūryaprakāśa contains explanations of almost every verse in Bījagaṇita, the explanations in Bījapallava are more informative and more elaborate with additional original ideas and examples.

== Salient features ==
Here are some of the salient features of Bījapallava:

1. The concept of "number line" and its application to explain addition and subtraction of positive and negative numbers.
2. Detailed proof of the Kuṭṭaka method for solving linear Diophantine equations.
3. Proof of Bhāskara II's rule for solving quadratic equations.
4. Proofs of the rules for solving linear equations in several unknowns, equations with higher powers of unknowns and equations with products of unknowns.

== Full text of the work ==
- Full text of Bījapallavaṃ, Kṛṣṇa Daivajña's commentary on the Bījagaṇita of Bhāskara II: Kṛṣṇa Daivajña (1958). Bijapallavam edited with Introduction by T. V. Radhakrishna Sastri. T. M. S. S. M. Library, Tanjore: S. Gopalan.
- Full text of a critical study on Bījapallavaṃ: Sita Sundar Ram (2012). Bijapallava of Kṛṣṇa Daivajña: Algebra in Sixteenth Century India, a Critical Study. Chennai: The Kuppuswami Sastri Research Institute.
