= Proportionality (mathematics) =

Property of two varying quantities with a constant ratio

The variable y is directly proportional to the variable x with proportionality constant ~0.6.

In mathematics, two sequences of numbers, often experimental data, are proportional or directly proportional if their corresponding elements have a constant ratio. The ratio is called coefficient of proportionality (or proportionality constant) and its reciprocal is known as constant of normalization (or normalizing constant). Two sequences are inversely proportional if corresponding elements have a constant product.

Two functions $f(x)$ and $g(x)$ are proportional if their ratio $\frac{f(x)}{g(x)}$ is a constant function.

If several pairs of variables share the same direct proportionality constant, the equation expressing the equality of these ratios is called a proportion, e.g., a/b = x/y = ⋯ = k (for details see Ratio). Proportionality is closely related to linearity.

== Direct proportionality ==
Given an independent variable x and a dependent variable y, y is directly proportional to x if there is a positive constant k such that
$$y = kx.$$

The relation is often denoted using the symbols ∝ (not to be confused with the Greek letter alpha) or ~:
$$y \propto x \quad\text{or}\quad y \sim x.$$

For x ≠ 0 the proportionality constant can be expressed as the ratio:
$$k = \frac{y}{x}.$$
It is also called the constant of variation or constant of proportionality.

Given such a constant k, the proportionality relation ∝ with proportionality constant k between two sets A and B is the equivalence relation defined by
$$\{(a, b) \in A \times B : a = k b\}.$$

A direct proportionality can also be viewed as a linear equation in two variables with y-intercept 0 and slope k > 0, which corresponds to linear growth.

=== Examples ===
- If an object travels at a constant speed, then the distance traveled is directly proportional to the time spent traveling, with the speed being the constant of proportionality.
- The circumference of a circle is directly proportional to its diameter, with the constant of proportionality equal to π.
- On a map of a sufficiently small geographical area, drawn to scale distances, the distance between any two points on the map is directly proportional to the beeline distance between the two locations represented by those points; the constant of proportionality is the scale of the map.
- The force, acting on a small object with small mass by a nearby large extended mass due to gravity, is directly proportional to the object's mass; the constant of proportionality between the force and the mass is known as gravitational acceleration.
- The net force acting on an object is proportional to the acceleration of that object with respect to an inertial frame of reference. The constant of proportionality in this, Newton's second law, is the classical mass of the object.

== Inverse proportionality ==
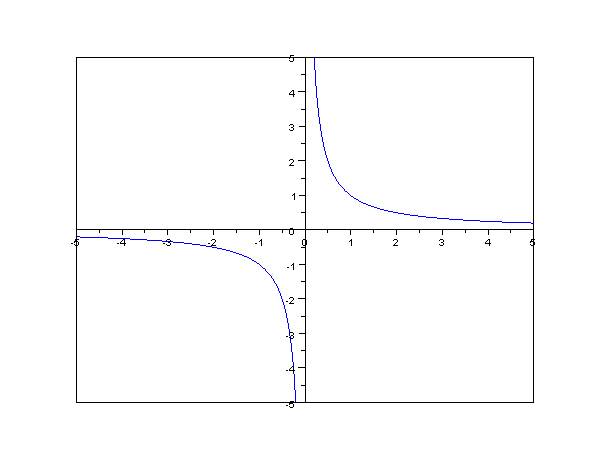
Inverse proportionality with product xy = 1. The variable y is inversely proportional to the variable x with proportionality constant 1.

Two variables are inversely proportional (also called varying inversely, in inverse variation, in inverse proportion) if each of the variables is directly proportional to the multiplicative inverse (reciprocal) of the other, or equivalently if their product is a constant. In symbols, one can write this relation as
$$y \propto 1/x \quad\text{or}\quad y \sim 1/x,$$
using the usual notations for direct proportionality.

It follows that the variable y is inversely proportional to the variable x if there exists a non-zero constant k such that
$$y = \frac{k}{x} \quad \iff \quad xy = k.$$
Hence the constant k is the product of x and y.

The graph of two variables varying inversely on the Cartesian coordinate plane is a rectangular hyperbola. The product of the x and y values of each point on the curve equals the constant of proportionality k. Since neither x nor y can equal zero (because k is non-zero), the graph never crosses either axis.

Direct and inverse proportion contrast as follows: in direct proportion the variables increase or decrease together. With inverse proportion, an increase in one variable is associated with a decrease in the other. For instance, in travel, a constant speed s dictates a direct proportion between distance travelled d and elapsed time t; in contrast, for a given distance (the constant), the time of travel is inversely proportional to speed: s × t = d.

== Hyperbolic coordinates ==
The concepts of direct and inverse proportion lead to the location of points in the Cartesian plane by hyperbolic coordinates; the two coordinates correspond to the constant of direct proportionality that specifies a point as being on a particular ray and the constant of inverse proportionality that specifies a point as being on a particular hyperbola.

== Computer encoding ==
The Unicode characters for proportionality are the following:

- U+221D ∝ PROPORTIONAL TO (&prop;, &Proportional;, &propto;, &varpropto;, &vprop;)
- U+007E ~ TILDE
- U+2237 ∷ PROPORTION
- U+223C ∼ TILDE OPERATOR (&sim;, &thicksim;, &thksim;, &Tilde;)
- U+223A ∺ GEOMETRIC PROPORTION (&mDDot;)

== See also ==
- Correlation – Statistical relationship
- Cross-multiplication – Mathematical technique
- Eudoxus of Cnidus – Greek astronomer and mathematician (c.390–c.340 BC)
- Hyperbolic growth – Growth function exhibiting a singularity at a finite time
- Intercept theorem – Theorem concerning ratios of line segments
- Inverse-square law – Physical law
- Linear map – Mathematical function, in linear algebra
- Sample size determination – Statistical considerations on how many observations to make
- Similarity – Property of objects which are scaled or mirrored versions of each other
- Trairāśika – Sanskrit word for "rule of three"
- Typeface anatomy – Graphic components of typeface letters
