= Nandigrama =

- Location in Maharashtra
- Coordinates: 18.38°N 72.92°E

Nandigrama is the name of a location, place or region somewhere in Western India where a school of astronomers and mathematicians flourished during the thirteenth-eighteenth centuries CE. David Pingree, one of America's leading historians of the exact sciences (primarily mathematics) in antiquity, identified Nandigrama with Nandod in Gujarat. However, modern scholarship has identified Nandigrama as the Nandgaon village in the Raigad district in Maharashtra State. It lies about 64 km south of Mumbai on the Konkan coast.

== Astronomers and mathematicians ==
Ganesa Daivajna was an astronomer born in 1507 in Nandigrama. His father Kesava Daivajna and paternal grandfather Kamalakara (not to be confused with Kamalakara of Golagrama) were also eminent astronomers. Kesava has been considered as one of the best observational astronomers of ancient India. Ganesa authored several important treatises and manuals on astronomy and astrology. Some of them are "Grahalaghava," "Laghu- and Brht-Tithi Chintamani,” a commentary on Bhaskara II’s "Siddharta Siromani," “Buddhi Vilasini," a commentary on Bhaskara II’s "Lilavati," "Sraddha nirnaya," “Patasarani,” and “Parva nimaya.” The “Graha Laghava” is extensively used by the Panchanga makers in Maharashtra, Gujarat, Andhra Pradesh, and Karnataka. In the “Graha Laghava,” planetary positions have been given at the instant of sunrise of the new moon day of Palguna of Saka 1441, which corresponds to March 19, AD 1520.

== See also ==
- Jambusagaranagara
- Dadhigrama
- Golagrama
