= Munishvara =

17th-century Indian mathematician

- Born: 1608
- Died: Unknown
- Other name: Munīśvara Viśvarūpa
- Occupation: Mathematician
- Known for: Siddhanta Sarvabhauma; Lilavativivruti
- Father: Ranganatha
- Relatives: Ballala (grandfather)

Munishvara or Munīśvara Viśvarūpa (born 1603) was an Indian mathematician who wrote several commentaries including one on astronomy, the Siddhanta Sarvabhauma (1646), which included descriptions of astronomical instruments such as the pratoda yantra. Another commentary he wrote was the Lilavativivruti. Very little is known about him other than that he came from a family of astronomers including his father Ranganatha who wrote a commentary called the Gụ̄hārthaprakaśa/Gūḍhārthaprakāśikā, a commentary on the Suryasiddhanta. His grandfather Ballala had his origins in Dadhigrama in Vidharba and had moved to Benares. Ballala had several sons who wrote commentaries on astronomy and mathematics. Munisvara's Siddhantasarvabhauma had the patronage of Shah Jahan like his paternal uncle Krishna Daivagna did. He was opposed to fellow mathematician Kamalakara, whose brother also wrote a critique of Munisvara's bhangi-vibhangi method for planetary motions. He was also opposed to the adoption of some mathematical ideas in spherical trigonometry from Arab scholars. An edition of his Siddhanta Sarvabhauma was published in the Princess of Wales Sarasvati Bhavana Granthamala series edited by Gopinath Kaviraj. Munisvara's book had twelve chapters in two parts. The second part had notes on astronomical instruments. He was a follower of Bhaskara II.

== See also ==
- Kṛṣṇa Daivajña
