= Golagrama =

Ancient Indian city of scientific importance

Golagrama was a village or region in India associated with several medieval Indian astronomers, astrologers and mathematicians. Presently there is no place bearing the name Golagrama anywhere in India. It is known that Golagrama was situated in Maharashtra State on the northern banks of river Godavari, was near Partha-puri (Pathari) in Maharashtra and was about 320 km away from Amravati town in Maharashtra. It is sometimes identified as a place named Golgam at latitude 18° N longitude 78° E. The name Golagrama considered as a word in Sanskrit could literally be translated as sphere-village.

== Golagrama school of astronomy ==
Several medieval Indian astronomers and mathematicians are known to have flourished in Golagrama. They were all members of one large extended family. The astronomical and mathematical knowledge of the members of this family was passed from generation to generation through teacher-pupil relationships. In nearly all the cases, the teacher would be an elder member of the family like father being a teacher of his son, elder brother being teacher of a younger brother. One of the most distinguished mathematicians of this family was Kamalakara. Kamalakara was born in Benares about 1616 after some members of the family migrated to Benares.

The lineage of astronomers and astrologers begins with one Rāma, a Maharshtian Brahmin residing at Golagrama. Rāma had a son by name Bhaṭṭācārya. He is known to have fathered Divākara Daivjña. Divākara Daivjña had five sons all experts in astrology and astronomy. Divākara Daivjña's sons were Viṣṇu, Kṛṣṇa, Mallāri, Keśava and Viśvanātha. Kṛṣṇa Daivajña had two sons Nṛsiṃha (also known as Nṛsiṃha Gaṇaka) born in 1586, and Śiva. Nṛsiṃha is known to have composed Saurabhāṣya, a commentary on Sūrysidhānta. Nṛsiṃha had composed Sidhāntaśromaṇi-Vāsanāvārttika a commentary on the Gaṇitādhyāya and Golādhyāya of Sidhāntaśiromaṇi-Vāsanābhāṣya of Bhāskara II.

Mallari (fl.1575) was a pupil of Ganesa (son of Keśava, born 1507). Mallari was also the uncle and teacher of Nrisimha (born 1586). He wrote a commentary on the Grahalaghava of Ganesa (born 1507) and also another treatise titled Parvadvayasadhana. Gaṇeśa composed in 1520 CE the Grahalāghava or Sidhāntarahasya a compendium of astronomical calculations. Nṛsiṃha (born 1586) had four sons Divākara (born 1606), Kamalākara, Gopinātha and Ranganātha. Kamalākara had composed in 1656 CE a treatise titled Sidhāntatattvaviveka which was course on astronomy founded mainly on Sūryasidhānta.

== Chart showing father-son relationships among members of the Golagrama school ==
Rāma
Bhaṭṭācārya
Divākara Daivajña
Viṣṇu	Kṛṣṇa	Mallāri	Keśava	Viśvanātha (c.1580)
Nṛsiṃha (born 1586)	Śiva	Gaṇeśa (born 1507)
Divākara (born 1606)	Kamalākara (born 1616)	Gopinātha	Raṅganātha

== Kamalakara ==
Kamalakara's father was Nrsimha of Golagrama who was born in 1586. Two of Kamalakara's brothers were also astronomers or mathematicians: Divakara elder than Kamalakara born in 1606 and Ranganatha who was younger than Kamalakara.

Kamalakara combined traditional Indian astronomy with Aristotelian physics and Ptolemaic astronomy as presented by Islamic scientists (especially Ulugh Beg). Following his family's tradition he wrote a commentary, Manorama, on Ganesa's Grahalaghava and, like his father, Nrsimha, another commentary on the Suryasiddhanta, called the Vasanabhasya ...

Kamalakara's most famous work is Siddhanta-tattva-viveka which was completed in 1658. It deals with standard topics usually dealt with in Indian astronomy texts. The third chapter of the book is mathematically most interesting. In it Kamalakara has used the addition and subtraction theorems for the sine and the cosine to give trigonometric formulae for the sines and cosines of double, triple, quadruple and quintuple angles. In this treatise Kamalakara also makes frequent use of the place-value number system with Sanskrit numerals.

== Schools of mathematics in medieval India ==
Historians of mathematics have identified several schools of mathematics that flourished in different parts of India during the 14th19th– centuries CE. It has also been noted that most of the mathematical activities during this period were concentrated in these schools. The schools were at places identified by the following names:

- Jambusagaranagara
- Dadhigrama (Vidarbha)
- Nandigrama (Maharashtra)
- Parthapura
- Golagrama (Maharashtra)
- Kerala
