= Mathematics in India (book) =

Book about the history of Indian mathematics

Mathematics in India: 500 BCE–1800 CE
- Author: Kim Plofker
- Language: English
- Subject: Indian mathematics
- Genre: Non-fiction
- Publisher: Princeton University Press
- Publication date: 2009

Mathematics in India: 500 BCE–1800 CE is a monograph about the history of Indian mathematics. It was written by American historian of mathematics Kim Plofker, and published in 2009 by the Princeton University Press. The Basic Library List Committee of the Mathematical Association of America has classified the book as essential for undergraduate mathematics libraries, their highest rating.

== Topics ==
Plofker has organized Mathematics in India into nine chapters, roughly chronologically, according to the "mainstream narrative" of Indian chronology in a subject where accurate chronology is difficult and disputed. It covers the mathematics of the entire Indian subcontinent, including the modern areas of Afghanistan, India, and Pakistan, but largely restricts itself to Sanskrit-language sources. Unlike many previous works in this area, it views Indian mathematics as a coherent whole, strongly connected to Indian culture and religion, both influencing and being influenced by the other cultures of the world, rather than as a collection of milestones for measuring relative progress against other cultures. Much of the scholarly work on this subject has been contradictory and contentious, and Plofker is careful to provide evidence for the hypotheses she supports, discuss alternative hypotheses, and view the subject neutrally for itself rather than as a way to boost or put down Indian culture. Her book includes some speculative theories, but is well-grounded in recent scholarship, and focused on evidence from the source material. It carefully maintains a balance between the cultural and scientific context needed to understand the mathematics it describes, the major texts and oral traditions through which that mathematics has come down to us, and the cross-cultural transmission of mathematical knowledge with other cultures.

The first introductory chapter provides an overview of Indian history of Indian mathematics and its scholarship, and of the religious and linguistic context of early Sanskrit texts, which leads to important differences from Indian mathematics to other ancient mathematical cultures developing from administrative or scientific works. Chapter two discusses the Vedic period from 1500 to 500 BCE, and the Shulba Sutras, religious instructional texts with significant mathematical content that are generally attributed to this period, although (as the book discusses) the absence of concrete astronomical observations within these texts has made it impossible to date them precisely. Topics from this period include its methods for reckoning time, its fascination with large numbers, the beginnings of decimal numbering and integer factorization, geometric constructions using cords or ropes, the Pythagorean theorem, and accurate approximations to pi and the square root of two. This chapter also includes material on speculative links between Vedic India and ancient Mesopotamia, a pet theory of Plofker's advisor David Pingree, but it notes the weakness of evidence for these theories.

The third chapter covers the next 500 years, the early classical period of India, including the Bhutasamkhya system for describing numbers in words and the invention of decimal place-value arithmetic (although Plofker suggests that the concept of zero may be an import from China), connections between poetic meter and binary representations, early trigonometry, the works of Pāṇini and Pingala (arguably including the invention of recursion), mathematics in Jainism and Buddhism from this period, and possible Greek influences in trigonometry and astrology, which became one of the driving forces in later mathematics. Chapter four covers roughly the first millennium CE, and focuses mainly on Indian astronomy and geocentrism, including the use of verse forms and interpolation to make memorization of trigonometric tables possible. Chapters five and six concern the medieval period of India. Chapter five overlaps in time with the later parts of chapter four, and concerns the works of Aryabhata, Bhāskara I, and Brahmagupta, and Mahāvīra, and the Bakhshali manuscript, including the invention of negative numbers and algebra, Brahmagupta's formula for the area of cyclic quadrilaterals, and the solution of Pell's equation. Chapter six covers later mathematicians Bhāskara II and Narayana Pandita, Bhāskara's works on geodesy, and the development of ideas related to calculus (although not really calculus itself). It also discusses the position of mathematicians in society, and the nature of mathematical canon, commentary, and proof in those times.

The Kerala school of astronomy and mathematics founded by Madhava of Sangamagrama is the topic of the seventh chapter, which includes Madhava's works on series expansions of trigonometric functions and the calculation of pi, and developments by Nilakantha Somayaji in the theory of astronomy. Chapter eight covers the interactions between India and mathematics in medieval Islam, including the transmission of decimal notation to the west and an increased awareness of mathematical rigor in India. Chapter nine concerns colonial and early modern times in India, the influence of European mathematics, and ongoing developments within Indian mathematics from the 16th through 18th centuries. Unfortunately, it stops just before the time of Srinivasa Ramanujan. The book concludes with a collection of still-unresolved major research questions in the area of Indian mathematics. Two appendices cover aspects of Sanskrit grammar and prosody that are important for understanding Indian mathematics, a glossary of technical terms, and a collection of biographies of Indian mathematicians. Throughout, many images of documents and artifacts of mathematical interest are included.

== Audience and reception ==
Mathematics in India does not require that its readers have any background in mathematics or the history of mathematics. It makes scholarship in this area accessible to a general audience, for instance by replacing many Sanskrit technical terms by English phrases, although it is "more of a research monograph than a popular book". Its readers are likely to come from many different audiences, including mathematicians, historians, indologists, philosophers, linguists, and philologists, and it succeeds in navigating the different expectations of these audiences.

Reviewer James Rauff recommends Mathematics in India to all students or teachers of the history of mathematics, calling it "meticulously researched, carefully argued, and beautifully written", and Benno van Dalen goes further, calling it required reading for all future students of this topic. Dominik Wujastyk calls it "path-breaking", "a classic work that should be owned and read by any scholar interested in the history of science in South Asia". Although calling it difficult reading for non-specialists, Ward Stewart suggests that it could also be valuable to high school teachers and that some of its material could be incorporated into their lessons, and although A. K. Bag calls it "mainly meant for the foreign audience", B. Ramanujam writes that it deserves to be better known among Indian schoolteachers in particular. Dominik Wujastyk suggests using it as the basis for university-level courses, and Toke Knudsen highlights its value as reference material for researchers in this area.

Both van Dalen and Agathe Keller write that the comprehensive English-language history of Indian mathematics in Mathematics in India was long-awaited, and several reviewers point to the History of Hindu Mathematics by Bibhutibhushan Datta and Awadhesh Narayan Singh from the 1930s as the only previous work that filled that role, albeit one organized by topic rather than by time. Reviewers also noted the novelty of the book's focus on mathematical astronomy, with Alexander Jones calling it "the best general introduction to the history of astronomy in India that we currently have". Despite some quibbles, Keller and Clemency Montelle both call the book "destined to be a classic".

A rare negative review is given by Satyanad Kichenassamy, who takes issue with the book's consideration of social context rather than purely of the mathematical content of the works it discusses, with its emphasis on astronomy as a force for mathematical development, with its omission of Malayalam-language works, with "a tendency to conflate ancient mathematical concepts with modern ones", and with many details of its conclusions.
