= Mean longitude =

Concept in orbital mechanics

Mean longitude is the ecliptic longitude at which an orbiting body could be found if its orbit were circular and free of perturbations. While nominally a simple longitude, in practice the mean longitude does not correspond to any one physical angle.

== Definition ==
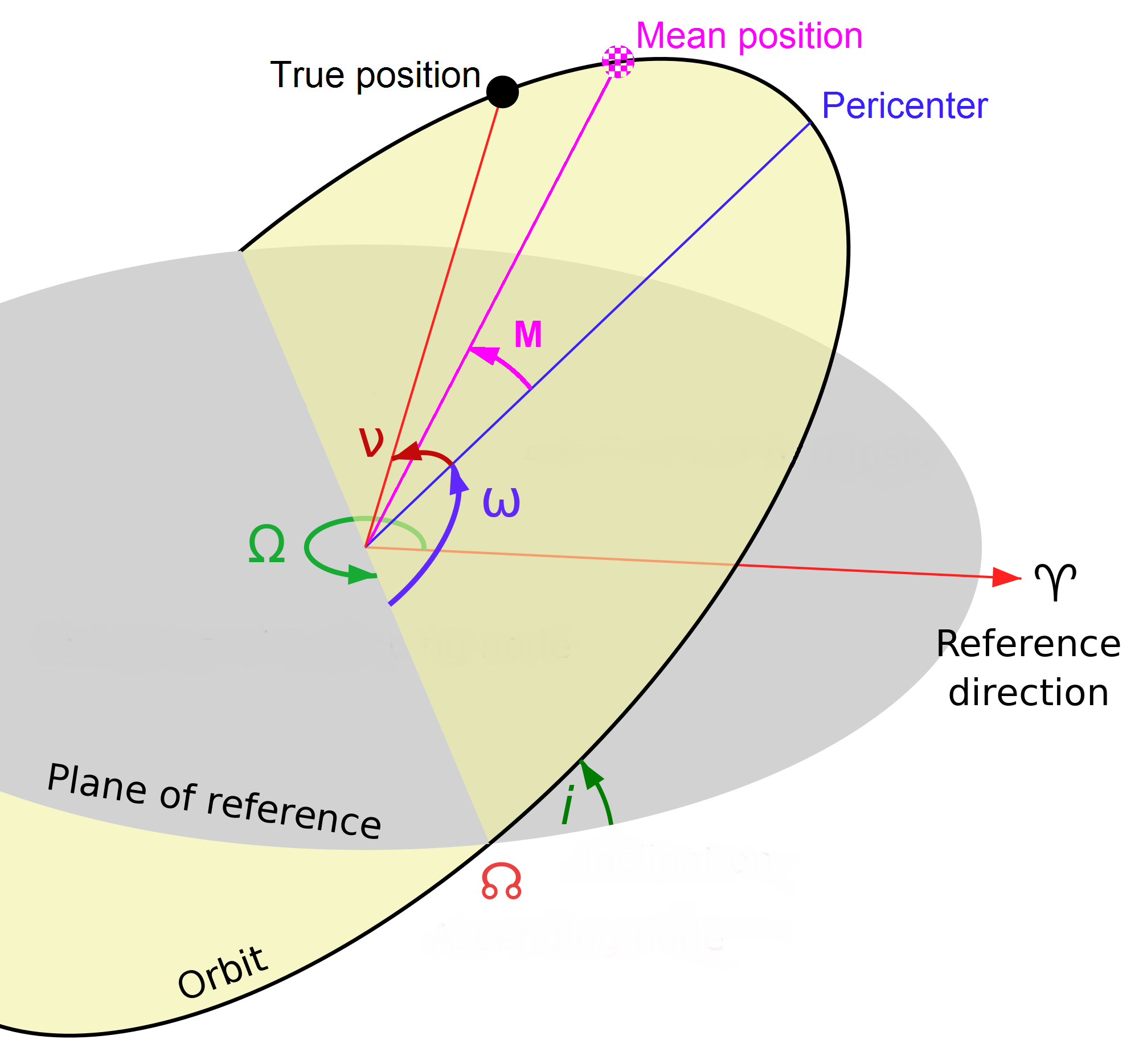
Diagram of an orbit. The plane of the orbit is in yellow, the reference plane is in gray, and the reference direction (vernal point) is the arrow in red. Also labeled are the mean anomaly (M) in pink, the true anomaly ($\nu$) in red, the argument of periapsis (ω) and periapsis in purple, the longitude of ascending node (Ω) in green, and the inclination (i) in dark green.

- Define a reference direction, ♈︎, along the ecliptic. Typically, this is the direction of the March equinox. At this point, ecliptic longitude is 0°.
- The body's orbit is generally inclined to the ecliptic, therefore define the angular distance from ♈︎ to the place where the orbit crosses the ecliptic from south to north as the longitude of the ascending node, Ω.
- Define the angular distance along the plane of the orbit from the ascending node to the pericenter as the argument of periapsis, ω.
- Define the mean anomaly, M, as the angular distance from the periapsis which the body would have if it moved in a circular orbit, in the same orbital period as the actual body in its elliptical orbit.

From these definitions, the mean longitude, L, is the angular distance the body would have from the reference direction if it moved with uniform speed,

$$L=\Omega+\omega+M$$,

measured along the ecliptic from ♈︎ to the ascending node, then up along the plane of the body's orbit to its mean position.

Sometimes the value defined in this way is called the "mean mean longitude", and the term "mean longitude" is used for a value that does have short-term variations (such as over a synodic month or a year in the case of the moon) but does not include the correction due to the difference between true anomaly and mean anomaly. Also, sometimes the mean longitude (or mean mean longitude) is considered to be a slowly varying function, modeled with a Maclaurin series, rather than a simple linear function of time.

The true longitude is a separate value that corresponds to the actual angular distance from the reference direction, taking into account the varying speed and non-circular shape of the orbit. It is the analogue to the true anomaly, which is measured relative to periapsis like the mean anomaly.

== Discussion ==
Mean longitude, like mean anomaly, does not measure an angle between any physical objects. It is simply a convenient uniform measure of how far around its orbit a body has progressed since passing the reference direction. While mean longitude measures a mean position and assumes constant speed, true longitude measures the actual longitude and assumes the body has moved with its actual speed, which varies around its elliptical orbit. The difference between the two is known as the equation of the center.

== Formulae ==
From the above definitions, define the longitude of periapsis

$$\varpi = \Omega + \omega$$.

Then mean longitude is also

$L=\varpi+M$.

Another form often seen is the mean longitude at epoch, ε. This is simply the mean longitude at a reference time t_{0}, known as the epoch. Mean longitude can then be expressed,

$L=\epsilon + n(t-t_0)$, or
$L=\epsilon + nt$, if t is measured relative to the epoch t_{0}.

where n is the mean angular motion and t is any arbitrary time. In some sets of orbital elements, ε is one of the six elements.

== See also ==
- Mean motion
- Orbital elements
- True longitude
