= T. A. Sarasvati Amma =

Indian mathematician

- T. A. Sarasvati Amma obituary photo
- Born: 26 December 1918
- Died: 15 August 2000 (aged 81)
- Occupation: Mathematician

T. A. Sarasvati Amma (Tekkath Amayankottukurussi Kalathil Sarasvati, also spelt as T. A. Saraswathi Amma; 26 December 1918 – 15 August 2000) was a scholar born in Cherpulassery, Palakkad district, Kerala, India. She contributed to the fields of history of mathematics and Sanskrit, through her work on Geometry of ancient and medieval India.

== Biography ==
Sarasvati Amma (born in Cherpulachery, Palakkad district, Kerala) was the second daughter of her mother Kuttimalu Amma and father Marath Achutha Menon to a Nair family. She took her basic degree in mathematics and physics from Madras University and obtained an M.A. degree in Sanskrit from Benares Hindu University. She studied under V. Raghavan, a Sanskrit scholar. Sarasvati Amma taught at Sree Kerala Varma College, Thrissur, Maharaja's College, Ernakulam and also at Women's College, Ranchi. She was the principal of Shree Shree Lakshmi Narain Trust Mahila Mahavidyalaya, Dhanbad, Jharkhand from 1973 to 1980. After retiring she lived in her home town Ottappalam until she died. She died in 2000. Her younger sister T. A. Rajalakshmi was a well-known story-writer and novelist in Malayalam who committed suicide in 1965.

== Academic career ==
The Kerala Mathematical Association started a regular Prof. T. A. Sarasvati Amma Memorial Lecture in its annual conference in 2002. In the words of Michio Yano, who reviewed Sarasvati Amma's book Geometry in Ancient and Medieval India, the book "established a firm foundation for the study of Indian geometry".

According to David Mumford, along with Kim Plofker's book Mathematics in India, "there is only one other survey, Datta and Singh’s 1938 History of Hindu Mathematics...supplemented by the equally hard to find Geometry in Ancient and Medieval India by Sarasvati Amma (1979)", where, "one can get an overview of most topics" in Indian mathematics.

Her book Geometry in Ancient and Medieval India is a survey of the Sanskrit and Prakrt scientific and quasi-scientific literature of India, beginning with the Vedic literature and ending with the early part of the 17th century. It deals in detail with the Sulba Sutras in the Vedic literature, with the mathematical parts of Jaina Canonical works and of the Hindu Siddhantas and with the contributions to geometry made by the astronomer mathematicians Aryabhata I & II, Sripati, Bhaskara I & II, Sangamagrama Madhava, Paramesvara, Nilakantha, his disciples and a host of others. The works of the mathematicians Mahavira, Sridhara and Narayana Pandita and the Bakshali Manuscript have also been studied. The work seeks to explore the theory that the Indian mathematical genius was predominantly algebraic and computational and that it eschewed proofs and rationales. There was a school in India which delighted in geometric demonstrations of algebraic results.

She was the doctoral advisor to historian of mathematics Radha Charan Gupta for his thesis “Trigonometry in Ancient and Medieval India”.

== Selected publications ==
=== Book ===
- T.A. Sarasvati Amma (2007). Geometry in Ancient and Medieval India. Motilal Banarsidass Publishers Limited. pp. 277. ISBN 978-81-208-1344-1.

=== Papers ===
- T.A. Sarasvati Amma (1958–1959). "Sredi-kshetras Or Diagrammatic representations of mathematical series". Journal of Oriental Research. 28: 74–85.
- T.A. Sarasvati Amma (1961). "The Cyclic Quadrilateral in Indian Mathematics". Proceedings of the All-India Oriental Conference. 21: 295–310.
- T.A. Sarasvati Amma (1961–1962). "The Mathematics of the First Four Mahadhikaras of Trilokaprajnapati". Journal of Ganganath Jha Research Institute. 18: 27–51.
- T.A. sarasvati Amma (1962). "Mahavira's Treatment of Series". Journal of Ranchi University. I: 39–50.
- T.A. Sarasvati Amma (1969). "Development of Mathematical Ideas in India". Indian Journal of History of Science. 4: 59–78.
