= Mean anomaly =

Specifies the orbit of an object in space

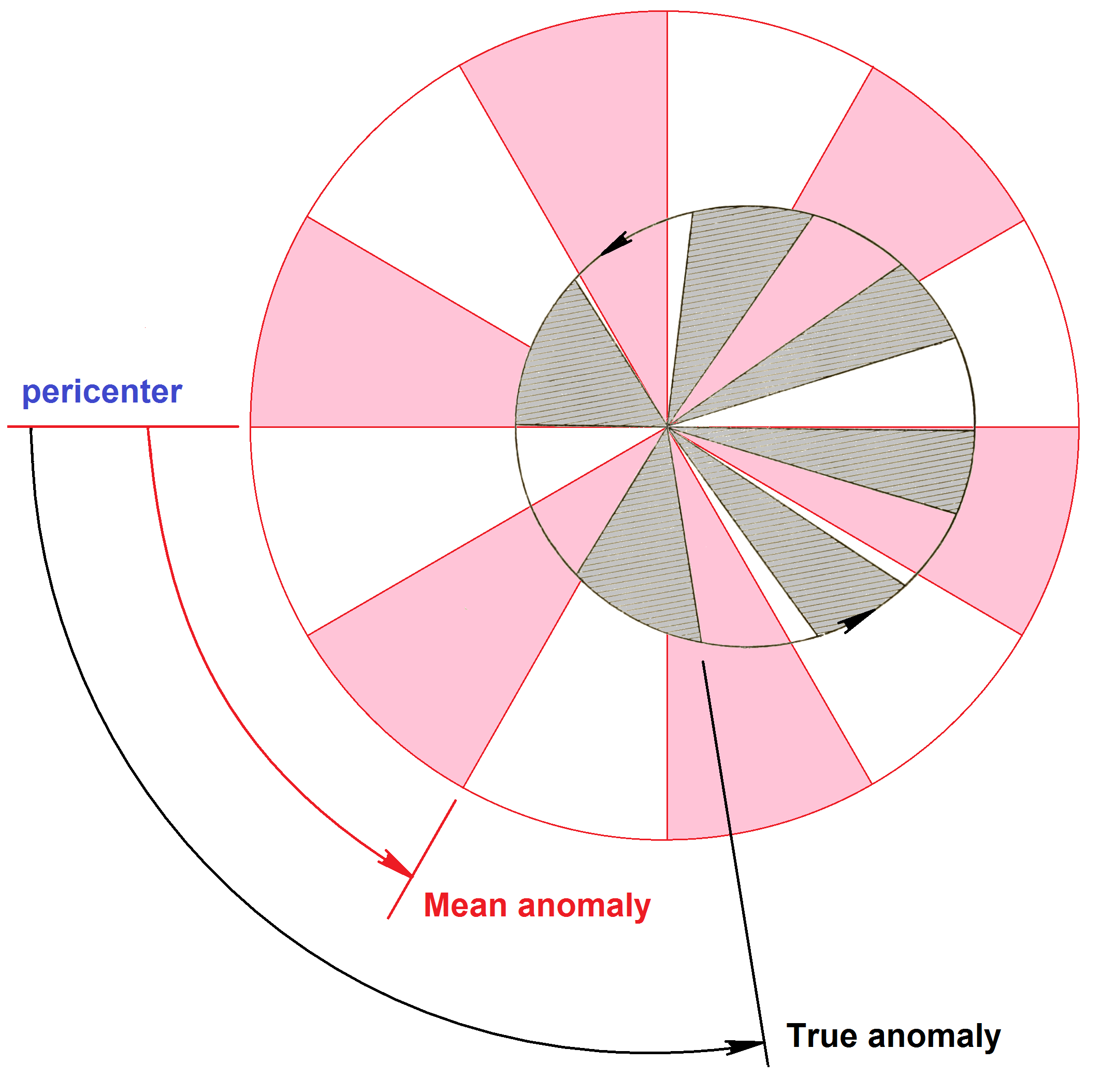
Shows constant areas being swept out per unit time by an object in an elliptical orbit, and by an imaginary object in a circular orbit with the same period. The angular sweep rate varies for the eliptic case. Also shows comparison of mean anomaly and true anomaly for two units of time. Note to avoid overlapping, the circular orbit has been magnified; in true scale the major axis diameter would be equal for ellipse and circle while the minor axis will be less for the ellipse sweeping out correspondingly less area per unit time (less angular momentum).

In celestial mechanics, the mean anomaly is the fraction of an elliptical orbit's period that has elapsed since the orbiting body passed periapsis, expressed as an angle which can be used in calculating the position of that body in the classical two-body problem. It is the angular distance from the pericenter which a fictitious body would have if it moved in a circular orbit, with constant speed, in the same orbital period as the actual body in its elliptical orbit.

== Definition ==
Define T as the time required for a particular body to complete one orbit. In time T, the radius vector sweeps out 2π radians, or 360°. The average rate of sweep, n, is then

$$n = \frac{\,2\,\pi\,}{T} = \frac{\,360^\circ\,}{T}~,$$

which is called the mean angular motion of the body, with dimensions of radians per unit time or degrees per unit time.

Define τ as the time at which the body is at the pericenter. From the above definitions, a new quantity, M, the mean anomaly can be defined

$$M = n\,(t - \tau) ~,$$

which gives an angular distance from the pericenter at arbitrary time t with dimensions of radians or degrees.

Because the rate of increase, n, is a constant average, the mean anomaly increases uniformly (linearly) from 0 to 2π radians or 0° to 360° during each orbit. It is equal to 0 when the body is at the pericenter, π radians (180°) at the apocenter, and 2π radians (360°) after one complete revolution. If the mean anomaly is known at any given instant, it can be calculated at any later (or prior) instant by simply adding (or subtracting) n⋅δt where δt represents the small time difference.

Mean anomaly does not measure an angle between any physical objects (except at pericenter or apocenter, or for a circular orbit). It is simply a convenient uniform measure of how far around its orbit a body has progressed since pericenter. The mean anomaly is one of three angular parameters (known historically as "anomalies") that define a position along an orbit, the other two being the eccentric anomaly and the true anomaly.

=== Mean anomaly at epoch ===
The mean anomaly at epoch, M_{0}, is defined as the instantaneous mean anomaly at a given epoch, t_{0}. This value is sometimes provided with other orbital elements to enable calculations of the object's past and future positions along the orbit. The epoch for which M_{0} is defined is often determined by convention in a given field or discipline. For example, planetary ephemerides often define M_{0} for the epoch J2000, while for Earth-orbiting objects described by a two-line element set the epoch is specified as a date in the first line.

== Formulae ==
The mean anomaly M can be computed from the eccentric anomaly E and the eccentricity e with Kepler's equation:

$$M = E - e \,\sin E ~.$$

Mean anomaly is also frequently seen as

$$M = M_0 + n\left(t - t_0\right) ~,$$

where M_{0} is the mean anomaly at the epoch t_{0}, which may or may not coincide with τ, the time of pericenter passage. The classical method of finding the position of an object in an elliptical orbit from a set of orbital elements is to calculate the mean anomaly by this equation, and then to solve Kepler's equation for the eccentric anomaly.

Define ϖ as the longitude of the pericenter, the angular distance of the pericenter from a reference direction. Define ℓ as the mean longitude, the angular distance of the body from the same reference direction, assuming it moves with uniform angular motion as with the mean anomaly. Thus mean anomaly is also

$$M = \ell - \varpi~.$$

Mean angular motion can also be expressed,

$$n = \sqrt{\frac{\mu}{\;a^3 \,} \,}~,$$

where μ is the gravitational parameter, which varies with the masses of the objects, and a is the semi-major axis of the orbit. Mean anomaly can then be expanded,

$$M = \sqrt{\frac{\mu}{\; a^3 \,}\,}\,\left(t - \tau\right)~,$$

and here mean anomaly represents uniform angular motion on a circle of radius a.

Mean anomaly can be calculated from the eccentricity and the true anomaly v by finding the eccentric anomaly and then using Kepler's equation. This gives, in radians:
$$M = \operatorname{atan2}\left( \sqrt{1 - e^2} \sin \nu ,  e + \cos \nu \right)-e \frac{\sqrt{1 - e^2} \sin \nu }{1 + e \cos \nu}$$
where atan2(y, x) is the angle from the x-axis of the ray from (0, 0) to (x, y), having the same sign as y.

For parabolic and hyperbolic trajectories the mean anomaly is not defined, because they don't have a period. But in those cases, as with elliptical orbits, the area swept out by a chord between the attractor and the object following the trajectory increases linearly with time. For the hyperbolic case, there is a formula similar to the above giving the elapsed time as a function of the angle (the true anomaly in the elliptic case), as explained in the article Kepler orbit. For the parabolic case there is a different formula, the limiting case for either the elliptic or the hyperbolic case as the distance between the foci goes to infinity – see Parabolic trajectory#Barker's equation.

Mean anomaly can also be expressed as a series expansion:
$$M = \nu +2\sum_{n=1}^{\infty}(-1)^n \left[\frac{1}{n} +\sqrt{1-e^2} \right]\beta^{n}\sin{n\nu}$$

with $\beta = \frac{1-\sqrt{1-e^2}}{e}$

$$M = \nu - 2\,e \sin \nu + \left( \frac{3}{4}e^2 + \frac{1}{8}e^4 \right)\sin 2\nu - \frac{1}{3} e^3 \sin 3\nu + \frac{5}{32} e^4 \sin 4\nu + \operatorname{\mathcal{O}}\left(e^5\right)$$

A similar formula gives the true anomaly directly in terms of the mean anomaly:

$$\nu = M + \left( 2\,e - \frac{1}{4} e^3 \right) \sin M + \frac{5}{4} e^2 \sin 2M + \frac{13}{12} e^3 \sin 3M + \operatorname{\mathcal{O}}\left(e^4\right)$$

A general formulation of the above equation can be written as the equation of the center:

$$\nu = M +2 \sum_{s=1}^{\infty} \frac{1}{s} \left[ J_{s}(se) +\sum_{p=1}^{\infty} \beta^{p}\big(J_{s-p}(se) +J_{s+p}(se) \big)\right]\sin(sM)$$

== See also ==
- Kepler's laws of planetary motion
- Mean longitude
- Mean motion
- Orbital elements
