= Bibhutibhushan =

Bibhutibhushan is a common given name of Bengali origin.

It may refer to:

- Bibhutibhushan Datta (1888–1958), Bengali-Indian historian of Indian mathematics
- Bibhutibhushan Bandyopadhyay (1894–1950), Bengali-Indian writer
- Bibhutibhushan Mukhopadhyay (1894–1987), Bengali-Indian writer
