= Radha Charan Gupta =

Indian historian of mathematics (1935–2024)

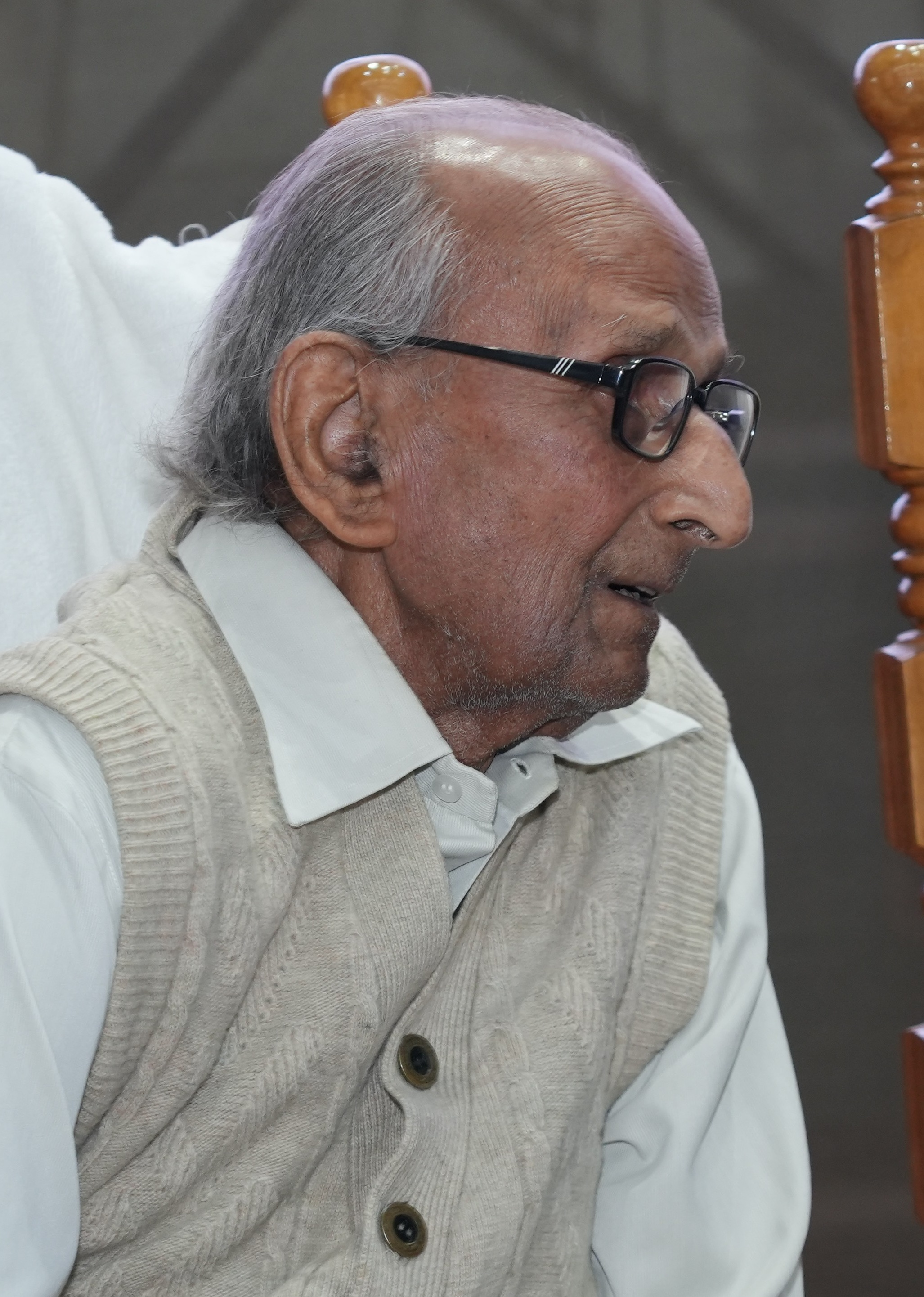
- Gupta in 2023
- Born: 14 August 1935; Jhansi, United Provinces, British India
- Died: 5 September 2024 (aged 89); Jhansi, Uttar Pradesh, India
- Education: Lucknow University (BA, MA); Ranchi University (PhD)
- Awards: Kenneth O. May Prize (2009); Padma Shri (2023)
- Scientific career
- Fields: History of mathematics
- Workplaces: Birla Institute of Technology, Mesra
- Thesis: Trigonometry in Ancient and Medieval India (1971)
- Doctoral advisor: T. A. Sarasvati Amma

Radha Charan Gupta (14 August 1935 – 5 September 2024) was an Indian historian of mathematics, specialising in the history of Indian mathematics.

== Life and career ==
Gupta was born on 14 August 1935 in Jhansi, in what is now Uttar Pradesh. He attended secondary school in Jhansi, but there were few opportunities locally to pursue higher education, so he continued his education at the University of Lucknow with a merit scholarship. He married Savitri Devi in 1953, urged by his family to marry young so the dowry received could help pay his sister's dowry. He completed his bachelor's degree in 1955 and his master's degree in 1957.

To support his family, Gupta took a teaching job instead of immediately continuing doctoral studies. He was a lecturer at Lucknow Christian College from 1957 to 1958. In 1958 he joined Birla Institute of Technology (BIT) in Ranchi.

In 1963 he read Datta and Singh's History of Hindu Mathematics, became interested in the history of mathematics, and got to know the mathematical historian T. A. Sarasvati Amma. She later supervised his Ph.D. at Ranchi University, which he finished in 1971 with the dissertation Trigonometry in Ancient and Medieval India.

Starting in 1979, he was in charge of BIT's Research Center for the History of Science. In 1982 he was awarded a full professorship at BIT, where he continued teaching until mandatory retirement in 1995. After retiring, Gupta continued his research in mathematical history.

Gupta died in Jhansi on 5 September 2024, at the age of 89.

== Works ==
In 1969 Gupta addressed interpolation in Indian mathematics. He wrote on Govindasvamin and his interpolation of sine tables. Furthermore, he contributed an article on the work of Paramesvara: "Paramesvara's rule for the circumradius of a cyclic quadrilateral".

In 2019, a collection of Gupta's papers was published as a book:

- Gupta, Radha Charan (2019). Ramasubramanian, K. (ed.). Gaṇitānanda: Selected Works of Radha Charan Gupta on History of Mathematics. Springer. doi:10.1007/978-981-13-1229-8. ISBN 978-981-13-1228-1.

== Awards and other professional activities ==
Gupta was one of the founders of the Indian Society for History of Mathematics, and in 1979 was the founding editor of its journal, Gaṇita Bhāratī, which he edited for over 25 years.

In 1991 he was elected a Fellow of the National Academy of Sciences, India, and in 1994 he became President of the Association of Mathematics Teachers of India. He became a corresponding member of the International Academy of the History of Science in February 1995.

In 2009 he was awarded the Kenneth O. May Prize alongside the British mathematician Ivor Grattan-Guinness. He was the first Indian to receive this prize.

In 2023, he was awarded the Padma Shri by the Government of India for his contributions in the field of literature and education.
