= Jambusagaranagara =

Historical location in India

Jambusāgaranagara (also written as Jambūsāronagara) is a place or region in India where a school of astronomers and mathematicians flourished during the fifteenth to eighteenth centuries CE. The location of this place has not been definitely identified.

Gangadhara, son of Govardhana and grandson of Divakara and younger brother of Vishnu and Laksmidhara, was a prominent mathematician of the Jambusagaranagara school who wrote Ganitamrtasagari a commentary on Lilavati of Bhaskara II and who flourished around 1420 CE. Govardhana and Divakara were themselves able mathematicians.

== Schools of mathematics ==
Historians of mathematics have identified several schools of mathematics that flourished in different parts of India during the fourteenth to nineteenth centuries CE. It has also been noted that most of the mathematical activities during this period were concentrated in these schools. The schools were at places identified by the following names:

- Jambusagaranagara
- Dadhigrama (Vidarbha)
- Nandigrama
- Parthapura (Maharashtra)
- Golagrama (Maharashtra)
- Kerala
