= Epoch (astronomy) =

Moment in time used as a reference point in astronomy

In astronomy, an epoch or reference epoch is a moment in time used as a reference point for some time-varying astronomical quantity. It is useful for the celestial coordinates or orbital elements of a celestial body, as they are subject to perturbations and vary with time. These time-varying astronomical quantities might include, for example, the mean longitude or mean anomaly of a body, the node of its orbit relative to a reference plane, the direction of the apogee or aphelion of its orbit, or the size of the major axis of its orbit.

The main use of astronomical quantities specified in this way is to calculate other relevant parameters of motion, in order to predict future positions and velocities. The applied tools of the disciplines of celestial mechanics or its subfield orbital mechanics (for predicting orbital paths and positions for bodies in motion under the gravitational effects of other bodies) can be used to generate an ephemeris, a table of values giving the positions and velocities of astronomical objects in the sky at a given time or times.

Astronomical quantities can be specified in any of several ways, for example, as a polynomial function of the time interval, with an epoch as a temporal point of origin (this is a common current way of using an epoch). Alternatively, the time-varying astronomical quantity can be expressed as a constant, equal to the measure that it had at the epoch, leaving its variation over time to be specified in some other way—for example, by a table, as was common during the 17th and 18th centuries.

The word epoch was often used in a different way in older astronomical literature, e.g. during the 18th century, in connection with astronomical tables. At that time, it was customary to denote as "epochs", not the standard date and time of origin for time-varying astronomical quantities, but rather the values at that date and time of those time-varying quantities themselves. In accordance with that alternative historical usage, an expression such as "correcting the epochs" would refer to the adjustment, usually by a small amount, of the values of the tabulated astronomical quantities applicable to a fixed standard date and time of reference (and not, as might be expected from current usage, to a change from one date and time of reference to a different date and time).

== Epoch versus equinox ==
Astronomical data are often specified not only in their relation to an epoch or date of reference but also in their relations to other conditions of reference, such as coordinate systems specified by "equinox", or "equinox and equator", or "equinox and ecliptic" – when these are needed for fully specifying astronomical data of the considered type.

=== Date-references for coordinate systems ===
When the data are dependent for their values on a particular coordinate system, the date of that coordinate system needs to be specified directly or indirectly.

Celestial coordinate systems most commonly used in astronomy are equatorial coordinates and ecliptic coordinates. These are defined relative to the (moving) vernal equinox position, which itself is determined by the orientations of the Earth's rotation axis and orbit around the Sun. Their orientations vary (though slowly, e.g. due to precession), and there is an infinity of such coordinate systems possible. Thus the coordinate systems most used in astronomy need their own date-reference because the coordinate systems of that type are themselves in motion, e.g. by the precession of the equinoxes, nowadays often resolved into precessional components, separate precessions of the equator and of the ecliptic.

The epoch of the coordinate system need not be the same, and often in practice is not the same, as the epoch for the data themselves.

The difference between reference to an epoch alone, and a reference to a certain equinox with equator or ecliptic, is therefore that the reference to the epoch contributes to specifying the date of the values of astronomical variables themselves; while the reference to an equinox along with equator/ecliptic, of a certain date, addresses the identification of, or changes in, the coordinate system in terms of which those astronomical variables are expressed. (Sometimes the word 'equinox' may be used alone, e.g. where it is obvious from the context to users of the data in which form the considered astronomical variables are expressed, in equatorial form or ecliptic form.)

The equinox with equator/ecliptic of a given date defines which coordinate system is used. Most standard coordinates in use today refer to 2000 TT (i.e. to 12h (noon) on the Terrestrial Time scale on January 1, 2000, see below), which occurred about 64 seconds sooner than noon UT1 on the same date (see ΔT). Before about 1984, coordinate systems dated to 1950 or 1900 were commonly used.

There is a special meaning of the expression "equinox (and ecliptic/equator) of date". When coordinates are expressed as polynomials in time relative to a reference frame defined in this way, that means the values obtained for the coordinates in respect of any interval t after the stated epoch, are in terms of the coordinate system of the same date as the obtained values themselves, i.e. the date of the coordinate system is equal to (epoch + t). (Note: Examples of this usage are seen in: Simon et al. 1994, pp. 663–683)

It can be seen that the date of the coordinate system need not be the same as the epoch of the astronomical quantities themselves. But in that case (apart from the "equinox of date" case described above), two dates will be associated with the data: one date is the epoch for the time-dependent expressions giving the values, and the other date is that of the coordinate system in which the values are expressed.

For example, orbital elements, especially osculating elements for minor planets, are routinely given with reference to two dates: first, relative to a recent epoch for all of the elements: but some of the data are dependent on a chosen coordinate system, and then it is usual to specify the coordinate system of a standard epoch which often is not the same as the epoch of the data. An example is as follows: For minor planet (5145) Pholus, orbital elements have been given including the following data:

Epoch 2010 Jan. 4.0 TT . . . = JDT 2455200.5
M 72.00071 . . . . . . . .(2000.0)
n. 0.01076162 .. . . . Peri . 354.75938
a 20.3181594 . . . . . Node . 119.42656
e. 0.5715321 . . . . . Incl .. 24.66109

where the epoch is expressed in terms of Terrestrial Time, with an equivalent Julian date. Four of the elements are independent of any particular coordinate system: M is mean anomaly (deg), n: mean daily motion (deg/d), a: size of semi-major axis (AU), e: eccentricity (dimensionless). But the argument of perihelion, longitude of the ascending node and the inclination are all coordinate-dependent, and are specified relative to the reference frame of the equinox and ecliptic of another date "2000.0", otherwise known as J2000, i.e. January 1.5, 2000 (12h on January 1) or JD 2451545.0.

=== Epochs and periods of validity ===
In the particular set of coordinates exampled above, much of the elements has been omitted as unknown or undetermined; for example, the element n allows an approximate time-dependence of the element M to be calculated, but the other elements and n itself are treated as constant, which represents a temporary approximation (see Osculating elements).

Thus a particular coordinate system (equinox and equator/ecliptic of a particular date, such as J2000.0) could be used forever, but a set of osculating elements for a particular epoch may only be (approximately) valid for a rather limited time, because osculating elements such as those exampled above do not show the effect of future perturbations which will change the values of the elements.

Nevertheless, the period of validity is a different matter in principle and not the result of the use of an epoch to express the data. In other cases, e.g. the case of a complete analytical theory of the motion of some astronomical body, all of the elements will usually be given in the form of polynomials in interval of time from the epoch, and they will also be accompanied by trigonometrical terms of periodical perturbations specified appropriately. In that case, their period of validity may stretch over several centuries or even millennia on either side of the stated epoch.

Some data and some epochs have a long period of use for other reasons. For example, the boundaries of the IAU constellations are specified relative to an equinox from near the beginning of the year 1875. This is a matter of convention, but the convention is defined in terms of the equator and ecliptic as they were in 1875. To find out in which constellation a particular comet stands today, the current position of that comet must be expressed in the coordinate system of 1875 (equinox/equator of 1875). Thus that coordinate system can still be used today, even though most comet predictions made originally for 1875 (epoch = 1875) would no longer be useful today, because of the lack of information about their time-dependence and perturbations.

== Changing the standard equinox and epoch ==
To calculate the visibility of a celestial object for an observer at a specific time and place on the Earth, the coordinates of the object are needed relative to a coordinate system of the current date. If coordinates relative to some other date are used, then that will cause errors in the results. The magnitude of those errors increases with the time difference between the date and time of observation and the date of the coordinate system used, because of the precession of the equinoxes. If the time difference is small, then fairly easy and small corrections for the precession may well suffice. If the time difference gets large, then fuller and more accurate corrections must be applied. For this reason, a star position read from a star atlas or catalog based on a sufficiently old equinox and equator cannot be used without corrections if reasonable accuracy is required.

Additionally, stars move relative to each other through space. Apparent motion across the sky relative to other stars is called proper motion. Most stars have very small proper motions, but a few have proper motions that accumulate to noticeable distances after a few tens of years. So, some stellar positions read from a star atlas or catalog for a sufficiently old epoch require proper motion corrections as well, for reasonable accuracy.

Due to precession and proper motion, star data become less useful as the age of the observations and their epoch, and the equinox and equator to which they are referred, get older. After a while, it is easier or better to switch to newer data, generally referred to as a newer epoch and equinox/equator, than to keep applying corrections to the older data.

== Specifying an epoch or equinox ==
Epochs and equinoxes are moments in time, so they can be specified in the same way as moments that indicate things other than epochs and equinoxes. The following standard ways of specifying epochs and equinoxes seem the most popular:

- Julian days, e.g., JD 2433282.4235 for January 0.9235, 1950 TT
- Besselian years (see below), e.g., 1950.0 or B1950.0 for January 0.9235, 1950 TT
- Julian years, e.g., J2000.0 for January 1.5, 2000 TT

All three of these are expressed in TT = Terrestrial Time.

Besselian years, used mostly for star positions, can be encountered in older catalogs but are now becoming obsolete. The Hipparcos catalog summary, for example, defines the "catalog epoch" as "J1991.25" (8.75 Julian years before January 1.5, 2000 TT, e.g., April 2.5625, 1991 TT).

== Besselian years ==
A Besselian year is named after the German mathematician and astronomer Friedrich Bessel (1784–1846). Meeus 1991, p. 125 defines the beginning of a Besselian year to be the moment at which the mean longitude of the Sun, including the effect of aberration and measured from the mean equinox of the date, is exactly 280 degrees. This moment falls near the beginning of the corresponding Gregorian year. The definition depended on a particular theory of the orbit of the Earth around the Sun, that of Newcomb (1895), which is now obsolete; for that reason among others, the use of Besselian years has also become or is becoming obsolete.

Lieske 1979, p. 282 says that a "Besselian epoch" can be calculated from the Julian date according to

B = 1900.0 + (Julian date − 2415020.31352) / 365.242198781

Lieske's definition is not exactly consistent with the earlier definition in terms of the mean longitude of the Sun. When using Besselian years, specify which definition is being used.

To distinguish between calendar years and Besselian years, it became customary to add ".0" to the Besselian years. Since the switch to Julian years in the mid-1980s, it has become customary to prefix "B" to Besselian years. So, "1950" is the calendar year 1950, and "1950.0" = "B1950.0" is the beginning of Besselian year 1950.

- The IAU constellation boundaries are defined in the equatorial coordinate system relative to the equinox of B1875.0.
- The Henry Draper Catalog uses the equinox B1900.0.
- The classical star atlas Tabulae Caelestes used B1925.0 as its equinox.

According to Meeus, and also according to the formula given above,

- B1900.0 = JDE 2415020.3135 = 1900 January 0.8135 TT
- B1950.0 = JDE 2433282.4235 = 1950 January 0.9235 TT

== Julian years and J2000 ==
A Julian year is an interval with the length of a mean year in the Julian calendar, i.e. 365.25 days. This interval measure does not itself define any epoch: the Gregorian calendar is in general use for dating. But, standard conventional epochs which are not Besselian epochs have been often designated nowadays with a prefix "J", and the calendar date to which they refer is widely known, although not always the same date in the year: thus J2000 refers to the instant of 12 noon (midday) on January 1, 2000, and J1900 refers to the instant of 12 noon on January 0, 1900, equal to December 31, 1899. It is also usual now to specify on what time scale the time of day is expressed in that epoch-designation, e.g. often Terrestrial Time.

In addition, an epoch optionally prefixed by "J" and designated as a year with decimals (2000 + x), where x is either positive or negative and is quoted to 1 or 2 decimal places, has come to mean a date that is an interval of x Julian years of 365.25 days away from the epoch J2000 = JD 2451545.0 (TT), still corresponding (in spite of the use of the prefix "J" or word "Julian") to the Gregorian calendar date of January 1, 2000, at 12h TT (about 64 seconds before noon UTC on the same calendar day). (See also Julian year (astronomy).) Like the Besselian epoch, an arbitrary Julian epoch is therefore related to the Julian date by

J = 2000 + (Julian date − 2451545.0) ÷ 365.25

Different astronomers or groups of astronomers used to define individually, but today standard epochs are generally defined by international agreements through the IAU, so astronomers worldwide can collaborate more effectively. It is inefficient and error-prone if data or observations of one group have to be translated in non-standard ways so that other groups could compare the data with information from other sources. An example of how this works: if a star's position is measured by someone today, they then use a standard transformation to obtain the position expressed in terms of the standard reference frame of J2000, and it is often then this J2000 position which is shared with others.

On the other hand, there has also been an astronomical tradition of retaining observations in just the form in which they were made, so that others can later correct the reductions to standard if that proves desirable, as has sometimes occurred.

The currently used standard epoch "J2000" is defined by international agreement to be equivalent to:

1. The Gregorian date January 1, 2000, at 12:00 TT (Terrestrial Time).
2. The Julian date 2451545.0 TT (Terrestrial Time).
3. January 1, 2000, 11:59:27.816 TAI (International Atomic Time).
4. January 1, 2000, 11:58:55.816 UTC (Coordinated Universal Time). (Note: This article uses a 24-hour clock, so 11:59:27.816 is equivalent to 11:59:27.816 a.m.)

== Epoch of the day ==
Over shorter timescales, there are a variety of practices for defining when each day begins. In ordinary usage, the civil day is reckoned by the midnight epoch, that is, the civil day begins at midnight. But in older astronomical usage, it was usual, until January 1, 1925, to reckon by a noon epoch, 12 hours after the start of the civil day of the same denomination, so that the day began when the mean sun crossed the meridian at noon. This is still reflected in the definition of J2000, which started at noon, Terrestrial Time.

In traditional cultures and in antiquity other epochs were used. In ancient Egypt, days were reckoned from sunrise to sunrise, following a morning epoch. This may be related to the fact that the Egyptians regulated their year by the heliacal rising of the star Sirius, a phenomenon which occurs in the morning just before dawn.

In some cultures following a lunar or lunisolar calendar, in which the beginning of the month is determined by the appearance of the New Moon in the evening, the beginning of the day was reckoned from sunset to sunset, following an evening epoch, e.g. the Jewish and Islamic calendars and in Medieval Western Europe in reckoning the dates of religious festivals, while in others a morning epoch was followed, e.g. the Hindu and Buddhist calendars.

== See also ==
- Astrometry
- Ephemeris time
- Epoch
- International Celestial Reference System and its realizations
- Time in astronomy
