= Kṛṣṇa Daivajña =

16th-17th century Indian scholar

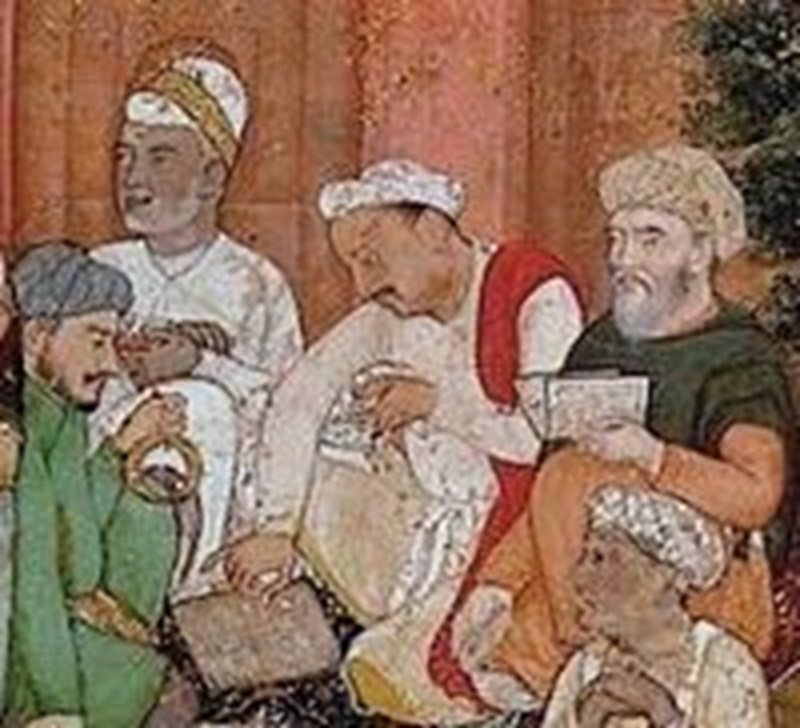
The man in the middle with white turban and casting the horoscope is believed to be Kṛṣṇa Daivajña.

Kṛṣṇa Daivajña was a 16th-17th century Indian astrologer-astronomer-mathematician from Varanasi patronized by the Mughal Emperor Jahangir. As a mathematician Kṛṣṇa Daivajña is best known for his elaborate commentary on Bhaskara II's (c. 1114–1185) Bījagaṇita and, as an astrologer, his fame rested on his commentary on Śrīpati's (c. 1019 – 1066) Jātakapaddhati. These commentaries contain not only detailed explanations of the text being commented upon, but also the rationales of the various rules and often additional original material. He has also composed an original work by name Chādakanirṇaya dealing with eclipses.

Kṛṣṇa Daivajña's family originally lived in Dadhigrama in the Vidarbha region; his father moved his family to Varanasi and took residence there. Kṛṣṇa Daivajña's father was Ballāla and his grandfather was Trimalla. He had five brothers of whom Ranganātha was known for his commentary Guḍharthaprāśikā on Suryasiddhanta. Several of his nephews, these include Munīśvara, Gadādhara and Nārāyaṇa, have composed reputed works on astrology and astronomy. He studied under Viṣṇu, a pupil of Nṛsiṃha who was a pupil and nephew of Gaṇeśa Daivajna the author of Grahalāghava.

Kṛṣṇa Daivajña was associated with the Mughal court. In his commentary on Jātakapaddhati, he used the birth date of Abdur Rahīm Khān-i Khānān, an influential courtier of the third Mughal emperor Akbar, to illustrate some of his astrological computations and observations. This points to his close connections to the Mughal court. Later, he came under the service of Jehangir from whom he received honor and emoluments. This has been attested by his nephews Munīśvara, Gadādhara and Nārāyaṇa in their writings. Subsequently, Munīśvara came under the patronage of Shah Jehan, and perhaps emulating his uncle Kṛṣṇa Daivajña, he used the emperor's date of accession as an example of a particular astrological practice in his astrological work.

== Works ==
=== Bījapallava: Commentary on Bhāskara II's Bījagaṇita ===
Among Kṛṣṇa Daivajña's various commentaries, the more widely known and studied one is his commentary called Bījapallava (also called Kalpālatāvatāra, Bījānkura and Nāvāakura) on Bījagaṇita. The commentary is in Sanskrit prose and contains more details than that are generally given in other conventional commentaries. T. Hayashi, a Japanese historian of Indian mathematics, in his forward to the critical edition of Bījapallava, writes: ". . . he [Kṛṣṇa Daivajña] goes on to discuss the mathematical contents in great detail, giving proofs (upapattis) for the rules and step-by-step solutions for the examples; but when the solution is easy, he merely refers to Bhaskara's auto-commentary. His discussions, often in the form of disputations between an imaginary opponent and himself, go deep into the nature of important mathematical concepts such as negative quantity, zero and unknown quantity, into the raison d'être of particular steps of the algorithms, and into various conditions for solubility of the mathematical problems treated in the Bijaganita."

=== Jātakapaddhati-udāharaṇa: Commentary on Śrīpati's Jātakapaddhati ===
Śrīpati's Jātakapaddhati is a standard work on nativities or birth charts. As already pointed out, in this work, to illustrate his arguments, Kṛṣṇa Daivajña took the birth date of Abdur Rahīm Khān-i Khānān, a prominent courtier of the third Mughal emperor Akbar. In this work he has also praised lavishly both Akbar and Khān-i Khānān.

=== Chadākanirṇaya ===
This is a work which deals with eclipses.

=== Janipaddhativṛtti ===
This work has been cited along with Chadakanirṇaya by Muniśvara in his commentary on Goladhyāya.

== An image of Kṛṣṇa Daivajña ==
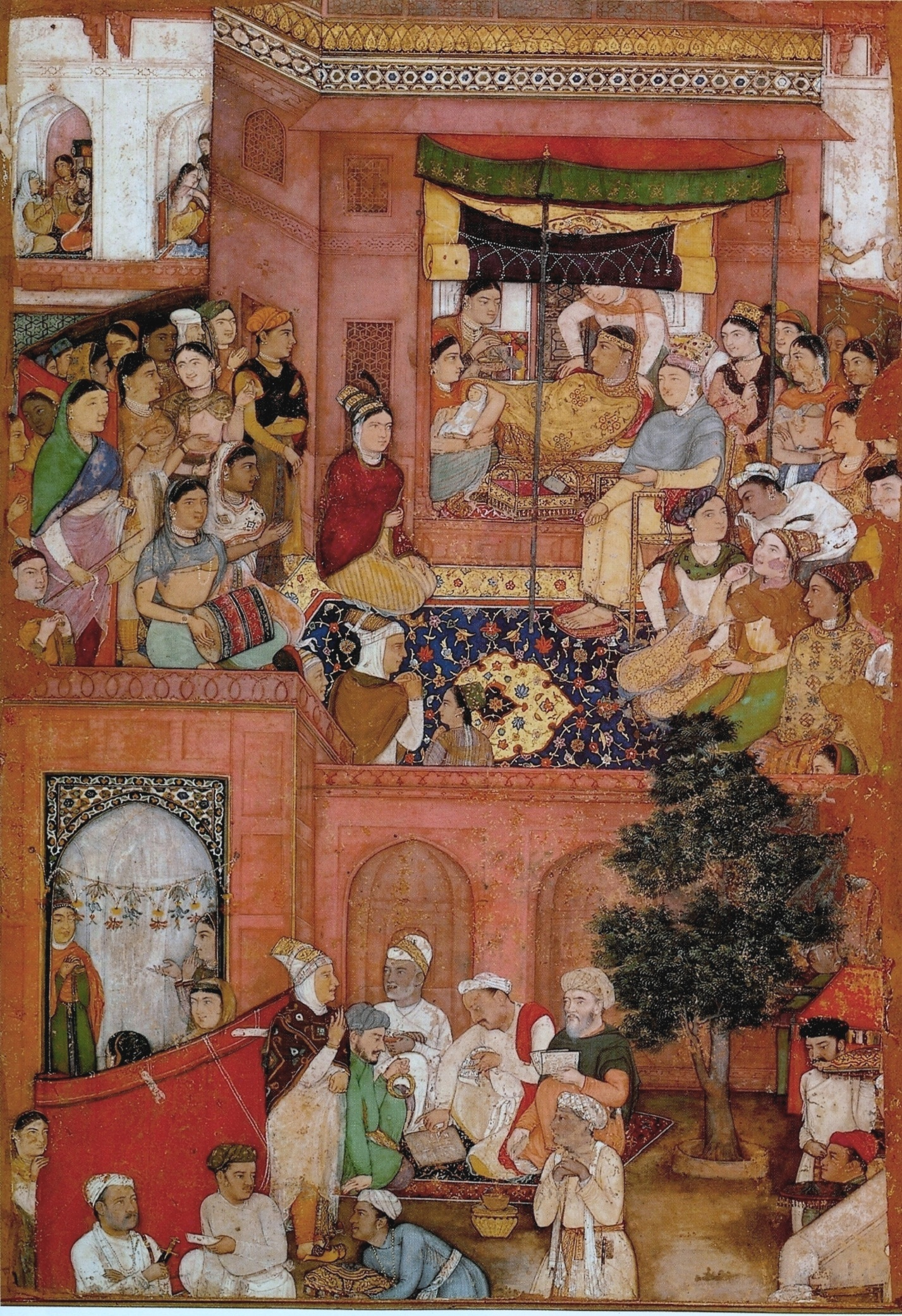
A Mughal painting depicting the birth scene of Jahangir. The four persons depicted as sitting together at the bottom of the painting are astrologers serving in the court of Akbar. The person in white turban casting the horoscope is believed to be Kṛṣṇa Daivajña.

There is a Mughal painting titled "Birth of a Prince", now preserved in Museum of Fine Arts, Boston, which depicts the birth scene of Jehangir in which there is shown a group of four astrologers casting the horoscope of the new born prince. Analyzing the image, S. R. Sarma has come to the conclusion that one of the four astrologers, the one who is depicted as drawing the birth chart, should be Kṛṣṇa Daivajña.

== See also ==
- Bījapallava

== Additional reading ==
- Full text of Bījapallavaṃ, Kṛṣṇa Daivajña's commentary on the Bījagaṇita of Bhāskara II: Kṛṣṇa Daivajña (1958). Bijapallavam edited with Introduction by T. V. Radhakrishna Sastri. T. M. S. S. M. Library, Tanjore: S. Gopalan.
- Full text of a critical study on Bījapallavaṃ: Sita Sundar Ram (2012). Bijapallava of Kṛṣṇa Daivajña: Algebra in Sixteenth Century India, a Critical Study. Chennai: The Kuppuswami Sastri Research Institute.
