= Keshava of Nandigrama =

16th-century Indian mathematician, astrologer and astronomer

Keshava (IAST: Keśava, fl. 1496–1507) was an astrologer and astronomer (jyotishi or daivajña) from Nandigrama in present-day western India.

== Biography ==
Keshava flourished around 1496–1507. He lived at Nandigrama in western India. He was a son of Kamala-kara of Kaushika gotra (clan), and a pupil of Vaijanatha (or Vaidyanatha). His wife's name was Lakshmi.

He had three sons, who were famous jyotishis:

- Ananta (fl. 1534): wrote Kalanirnayavabodha and a commentary (1534 CE) on Varaha-mihira's Laghu-jataka
- Ganesha (born 1507): wrote a number of works during 1522–1554; his great-grandson - also called Ganesha - wrote Shiromani-prakasha
- Rama (fl. 1525/1550): his son Nrsimha (born 1548) wrote Graha-kaumudi, Kheta-muktavali, Graha-dasha-phala, Graha-dipika, Varsha-phala-dipika, Harsa-kaumudi (a commentary on Ganesha's Graha-laghava), and Hillaja-dipika

== Works and commentaries ==
Muhurtadipika by his son Ganesha lists several works written by Keshava. Sometimes, Ganesha's works are also attributed to Keshava. Works written by Keshava include:

- Graha-kautuka (1496 CE)
- a commentary on Graha-kautuka
- Graha-siddhi
- Tithi-siddhi
- Graha-chalana
- Ganita-dipika
- Jataka-paddhati, also known as Keshava-paddhati; Brhat-keshavi is an enlarged version of this text
  - Apparently a condensed version of Shripati's JKP: it is an extremely concise text containing only 42 verses, and was very popular as a handbook on mathematical calculations essential for jataka.
- A commentary on Jataka-paddhati
- Tajika-paddhati, also known as Varsha-phala-paddhati or Tajika-keshavi
  - A work on Tajika (Arabic-Persian astrology), it contains 26 verses
- Siddhanta-vasana
- Kayasthachara-paddhati
- Kundastaka-lakshana

The following works of Keshava survive in form of manuscripts, several of which are incomplete:

- Graha-kautuka (over 10 manuscripts), and possibly the commentary on it; over 10 manuscripts survive
- Jataka-paddhati and Brhat-keshavi (over 200 manuscripts), and the commentary on it (over 25 manuscripts)
- Tajika-paddhati (around 50 manuscripts)
- Muhurtatattva, containing two parts - Muhurta-khanda and Samhita-khanda (around 100 manuscripts)
- Sudhiranjani (2 manuscripts), a karana (concise exposition of astronomy) and apparently an appendix to Varsha-paddhati

=== Commentaries ===
Besides Keshava himself, several later authors have written commentaries (tika) on his works:

- Jataka-paddhti
  - Keshava himself
  - Vishva-natha (1618) at Kashi
  - Praudha-manorama by Diva-kara (1626) at Kashi
  - Vasana-bhashya by Dharmeshvara (c. 1600–1650) in Malava
  - Jataka-kaustubha by Narayana (1678) at Kashi
  - Guru-dasa (1824) at Jalandhara
  - several modern editors
- Tajika-paddhati
  - Mallari (fl. 1612)
  - Vishva-natha (fl. 1612/1630)
- Muhurta-tattva
  - Muhurta-dipika by Keshava's son Ganesha (born 1507)
  - Vishva-natha (fl. 1612/1630)

Ganesha's Graha-laghava or Siddhanta-rahasya was apparently based on his father's Graha-kautuka.
