= Grahalaghava =

16th-century Sanskrit treatise on astronomy

Grahalāghavaṃ is a Sanskrit treatise on astronomy composed by Gaṇeśa Daivajna (c. 1507–1554), a sixteenth century astronomer, astrologer, and mathematician from western India, probably from the Indian state of Maharashtra. It is a work in the genre of the karaṇa text in the sense that it is in the form of a handbook or manual for the computation of the positions of the planets. Of all the ancient and medieval karaṇa texts on astronomy, Grahalāghavaṃ is the most popular among the pañcāṅgaṃ makers of most parts of India.It is also considered to be the most comprehensive, exhaustive and easy to use karaṇa text on astronomy. The popularity of this work is attested by the large number of commentaries (at least 14 in number) on it and also by the large number of modern editions (at least 23 in number) of the book. The work is divided into sixteen chapters and covers all the commonly discussed topics in such texts including planetary positions, timekeeping and calendar construction, eclipses, heliacal rising and settings, planetary conjunctions, and the mahāpāta-s.

The most striking features of the work that made it highly popular include its use of an ingenious method to reduce the traditional method of computations involving 'astronomical numbers' to smaller numbers and its meticulous and careful avoidance of the use of the trigonometrical sines by replacing them with simpler, still acceptably accurate, algebraic expressions. The former is effected by introducing the concept of a new cycle called a cakra, a period consisting of 4016 days which is approximately 11 years. Traditional computations make use the concept of ahargaṇa which is the number of civil days elapsed since the kali epoch which falls on 17/18 February 3102 BCE. The traditional ahargaṇa is a huge number. For example, the ahargaṇa corresponding to 1 January 2025 is 1872211. The ahargaṇa as modified in Grahalāghavaṃ is the remainder number of days after completing full cakra-s of 4016 days each since the beginning of the epoch. Thus the modified ahargaṇa corresponding to 1 January 2025 would be 755, a number less than 4016. To avoid the use of trigonometrical sines, Grahalāghavaṃ uses several approximations to the sine function. For example, in the context of computing the true longitudes of celestial objects, approximation formulas based on the following approximation to the sine function (known as the Bhāskara I's sine approximation formula) is used:

$$\sin x^\circ \approx \frac{4x(180 - x)}{40500 - x(180 - x)}.$$

In the context of the computation of eclipses, the following approximation is used:

When $x$ is small, $\sin x^\circ \approx \frac{3}{175}x.$ It may be noted that this is an approximation to the well known result $\sin \theta\approx \theta$ when $\theta$ is in radians and is small.

== Full texts ==
Full text of the work with commentaries in Sanskrit and with English translation are available at the following sources:

- Kapilesvara Sasthri (1948). The Grahalaghava of Ganesa Daivajnja with Sanskrit Commentary by Visvanatha Daivajnja. Benares City: Jayakrishna das Haridas Gupta.
- For an English translation of the full text of Grahalāghavaṃ see: Rao, S. Balachandra & S. K. Uma, Grahalaghavam of Ganesa Daivajna – an English Exposition, Mathematical Explanation and Notes, IJHS 41.1 (2006) Supplement pp. S1-88; 41.2 (2006) Supplement pp. S89-183; 41.3 (2006) Supplement pp. S185-315; 41.4 (2006) Supplement pp. S317-415.
