= Takao Hayashi =

Japanese mathematics educator

Takao Hayashi (born 1949) is a Japanese mathematics educator, historian of mathematics specializing in Indian mathematics. Hayashi was born in Niigata, Japan. He obtained Bachelor of Science degree form Tohoku University, Sendai, Japan in 1974, Master of Arts degree from Tohuku University, Sendai, Japan in 1976 and a postgraduate degree from Kyoto University, Japan in 1979. He secured the Doctor of Philosophy degree from Brown University, USA in 1985 under the guidance of David Pingree. He was a researcher at Mehta Research Institute for Mathematics and Mathematical Physics, Allahabad, India during 1982–1983, a lecturer at Kyoto Women's College during 1985–1987. He joined Doshisha University, Kyoto as a lecturer in history of science in 1986 and was promoted as professor in 1995. He has also worked in various universities in Japan in different capacities.

== Publications ==
Hayashi has a large number of research publications relation to the history of Indian mathematics. He has also contributed chapters to several encyclopedic publications. The books he has published include:

- The Bakhshali Manuscript: An Ancient Indian Mathematical Treatise, Egbert Forsten Publishing, 1995
- (jointly with S. R. Sarma, Takanori Kusuba and Michio Yano), Gaṇitasārakaumudī: The Moonlight of the Essence of Mathematics by Thakkura Pherū, Manohar Publishers and Distributors, 2009
- Kuṭṭā̄kāraśiromaṇi of Devarāja: Sanskrit Text with English Translation, Indian National Science Academy, 2012
- Gaṇitamañjarī of Gaṇeśa, Indian National Science Academy, 2013
- (jointly with Clemency Montelle, K. Ramasubramanian) Bhāskara-prabhā, Springer Singapore, 2018

== Awards/Prizes ==
The awards and prizes conferred on Hayashi include:

- The Salomon Reinach Foundation Prize, Institut de France (2001)
- Kuwabara Prize, the History of Mathematics Society of Japan (2005)
- Publication Prize, Mathematical Society of Japan (2005)
