= History of Hindu Mathematics =

Book on history of Indian mathematics

History of Hindu Mathematics: A Source Book
- Title page for History of Hindu Mathematics: A Source Book (1962)
- Author: Bibhutibhushan Datta and Awadhesh Narayan Singh
- Language: English
- Subject: History of Indian mathematics
- Publisher: Asia Publishing House, Calcutta
- Publication date: 1962 (single volume set)
- Pages: 610

History of Hindu Mathematics: A Source Book is a treatise on the history of Indian mathematics authored by Bibhutibhushan Datta and Awadhesh Narayan Singh and originally published in two parts in 1930's. The book has since been reissued in one volume by Asia Publishing House in 1962. The treatise has been a standard reference for the history of Indian mathematics for many years.

== History of the book ==
Bibhutibhushan Datta, the senior author of the book, delivered a lecture titled "Contribution of the Ancient Hindus to Mathematics" on 20 December 1927 to the Allahabad University Mathematical Association. This address was published in the Bulletin of the Allahabad University Mathematical Association in two papers totalling 60 pages in length. Datta expanded this paper and wrote the treatise History of Hindu Mathematics in three volumes. Datta retired from academic life in 1933 and became an itinerant ascetic. At the time of retirement, the manuscript of the three-volume work was entrusted to his junior colleague Awadhesh Narayan Singh. Singh published the first two of these volumes as a joint publication. The first volume titled History of Hindu Mathematics. A Source Book (Part 1: Numerical notation and arithmetic) was published in 1935 and the second volume titled History of Hindu Mathematics. A Source Book (Part 2: Algebra) was published in 1938. The planned third volume was never published.

== Contents of the book ==
The book is a source book and index. Under various topics are the collected translations of Sanskrit texts as found in Hindu mathematical texts.

=== Part 1 ===
Part 1 of the book is divided into chapters. Chapter 1 gives details of the various methods employed by the Hindus for denoting numbers. The chapter also contains details of the gradual evolution of the decimal place value notation in India. Chapter 2 deals with arithmetic in general and it contains the details of various methods for performing the arithmetical operations using a "board". The evolution of the operations of addition, subtraction, multiplication, division, squaring, cubing, and the extraction square root and cube root are all discussed in detail.

=== Part 2 ===
The whole of Part 2, running to about 307 pages, constitutes one chapter numbered as Chapter 3 of the book. Some of the topics discussed in this chapter are linear equations with one unknown and with two unknowns, quadratic equations, linear indeterminate equations, solutions of equations of the form $Nx^2 + 1 = y^2$, indeterminate equations of higher degrees, and rational triangles.

== From reviews ==
Reactions to the publication of the book were mixed: some were highly favorable and some were highly critical. For example, the reviewer in American Mathematical Monthly found the book "From the standpoint of authoritative subject matter and from that of book-making, it is a notable history", whereas the reviewer in Isis, a journal of the History of Science Society, found the book "... a mathematical panegyric on Hindu history. A history of Hindu mathematics still remains to be written".

=== From the review in American Mathematical Monthly ===
"Readers of the 'Monthly' have become familiar with the name of one of the authors of this work since articles by B Datta have been appearing over a period of ten years. Through these articles, he has won a place as a reliable research worker in the field of Hindu mathematics. It is gratifying that a work on the history of Hindu mathematics has now come from the hands of these two Hindu scholars; moreover that a complete history to appear in compact form is here begun with the promise of volumes to come. The work under consideration is the first part and deals with the history of the numeral notation and of arithmetic. The second part, we are told, is devoted to algebra and the third part contains the history of geometry, trigonometry, calculus and various other topics such as magic squares, theory of series and permutations and combinations. ... Datta and Singh's 'History of Hindu Mathematics' should be in every library which reaches standards covered by the word "approved." It should be owned by individuals who have any interest whatever in the history of the progress of science. From the standpoint of authoritative subject matter and from that of book-making, it is a notable history."

=== From the review in Isis ===
". . . I would like to say that the book before us certainly contains an abundance of material for the history of Hindu mathematics, but the material presented has to be used with caution. The authors, as native Hindu scholars, are certainly possessed of a deep erudition in Hindu literature, but they display a lack of training in the modern methods of philological and historical criticism, which deficiency is still enhanced by a too perspicuous bias and a tendency towards exaggerating the achievements of the Hindu race. As an industrious collection of material and as a starting point for further critical investigation the present volume is very welcome indeed. But, on the whole, it impresses us as a mathematical panegyric on Hindu history. A history of Hindu mathematics still remains to be written."

== Scan available ==
A scan of the book is available: History of Hindu Mathematics: A Source Book. 1935 – via Internet Archive.
