= Kripa Shankar Shukla =

Historian of Indian mathematics (1918-2007)

Kripa Shankar Shukla (10 July 1918 - 22 September 2007) was a historian of Indian mathematics. He was awarded the DLitt degree by Lucknow University in 1955 for his thesis on “Astronomy in the Seventh Century India: Bhāskara I and His Works” which was completed under the guidance of A. N. Singh. He retired in 1979.

Shukla published several important source works in Indian mathematics and astronomy with translations, notes, explanations. He also authored a large number of research papers bringing out many previously unknown facts about the historical development of mathematics in India. He continued his active research even after retiring from his official position in Lucknow University. Shukla supervised the research work of several research scholars including that of Yukio Ohashi (1955 - 2019) from Japan whose dissertation was titled "A History of Astronomical Instruments in India".

== Publications ==
=== Source works brought out by K. S. Shula ===
The important source works brought out by Shukla include the following:

1. Sūrya-siddhānta with the commentary of Parameśvara (1957)
2. Pāṭīgaṇita of Śrīdharācārya (1959)
3. Mahābhāskarīya of Bhāskara I (1960)
4. Laghubhāskarīya of Bhāskara I (1963)
5. Dhīkoṭida-karaṇa of Śrīpati (1969)
6. Bījagaṇitāvataṃsa of Nārāyaṇa Paṇḍita (1970)
7. Āryabhaṭīya of Āryabhaṭa (1976)
8. Āryabhaṭīya of Āryabhaṭa with the commentary of Bhāskara I and Someśvara (1976)
9. Karaṇaratna of Devācārya (1979)
10. Vaṭeśvarasiddhānta and Gola of Vaṭeśvara (2 Vols) (1985–86)
11. Laghumānasa of Mañjula (1990)
12. Gaṇitapañcaviṃśī (published posthumously) (2017)

=== Research papers ===
Aditya Kolachana, K. Mahesh and K. Ramasubramanian have brought out a 754-page volume containing a collection of selected articles by Shukla under the title "Studies in Indian Mathematics and Astronomy" in 2019.

== Awards and accolades ==
The awards and prizes conferred on Shukla include the following:

- Awarded Banerji Research Prize of University of Lucknow
- 1984: Elected Fellow of the National Academy of Sciences, India
- 1988: Selected as a Corresponding Member of the International Academy of the History of Science, Paris.
