= True longitude =

In celestial mechanics, true longitude is the ecliptic longitude at which an orbiting body could actually be found if its inclination were zero. Together with the inclination and the ascending node, the true longitude can tell us the precise direction from the central object at which the body would be located at a particular time.

== Calculation ==
The true longitude l can be calculated as follows:

l = ν + ϖ

where:

- ν is the orbit's true anomaly,
- ϖ ≡ ω + Ω is the longitude of orbit's periapsis,
  - ω is the argument of periapsis, and
  - Ω is the longitude of the orbit's ascending node,
