= Cross-multiplication =

Mathematical technique

In mathematics, specifically in elementary arithmetic and elementary algebra, given an equation between two fractions or rational expressions, one can cross-multiply to simplify the equation or determine the value of a variable.

The method is also occasionally known as the "cross your heart" method because lines resembling a heart outline can be drawn to remember which things to multiply together.

Given an equation like

$$\frac a b = \frac c d,$$

where b and d are not zero, one can cross-multiply to get

$$ad = bc \quad \text{or} \quad a = \frac{bc}d.$$

In Euclidean geometry the same calculation can be achieved by considering the ratios as those of similar triangles.

== Procedure ==
In practice, the method of cross-multiplying means that we multiply the numerator of each (or one) side by the denominator of the other side, effectively crossing the terms over:

$$\frac a b \nwarrow \frac c d, \quad \frac a b \nearrow \frac c d.$$

The mathematical justification for the method is from the following longer mathematical procedure. If we start with the basic equation

$$\frac a b = \frac c d,$$

we can multiply the terms on each side by the same number, and the terms will remain equal. Therefore, if we multiply the fraction on each side by the product of the denominators of both sides—bd—we get

$$\frac a b \times bd = \frac c d \times bd.$$

We can reduce the fractions to lowest terms by noting that the two occurrences of b on the left-hand side cancel, as do the two occurrences of d on the right-hand side, leaving

$$ad = bc,$$

and we can divide both sides of the equation by any of the elements—in this case we will use d—getting

$$a = \frac{bc}d.$$

Another justification of cross-multiplication is as follows. Starting with the given equation

$$\frac a b = \frac c d,$$

multiply by d/d = 1 on the left and by b/b = 1 on the right, getting

$$\frac a b \times \frac d d = \frac c d \times \frac b b,$$

and so

$$\frac{ad}{bd} = \frac{cb}{db}.$$

Cancel the common denominator bd = db, leaving

$$ad = cb.$$

Each step in these procedures is based on a single, fundamental property of equations. Cross-multiplication is a shortcut, an easily understandable procedure that can be taught to students.

== Use ==
This is a common procedure in mathematics, used to reduce fractions or calculate a value for a given variable in a fraction. If we have an equation

$$\frac x b = \frac c d,$$

where x is a variable we are interested in solving for, we can use cross-multiplication to determine that

$$x = \frac{bc}d.$$

For example, suppose we want to know how far a car will travel in 7 hours, if we know that its speed is constant and that it already travelled 90 miles in the last 3 hours. Converting the word problem into ratios, we get

$$\frac x{7\ \text{hours}} = \frac{90\ \text{miles}} {3\ \text{hours}}.$$

Cross-multiplying yields

$$x = \frac{7\ \text{hours} \times 90\ \text{miles}}{3\ \text{hours}},$$

and so

$$x = 210\ \text{miles}.$$

Alternate solution

90miles/3hours=30mph

So, 30mph×7hours=210miles.

Note that even simple equations like

$$a = \frac{x}{d}$$

are solved using cross-multiplication, since the missing b term is implicitly equal to 1:

$$\frac a 1 = \frac x d.$$

Any equation containing fractions or rational expressions can be simplified by multiplying both sides by the least common denominator. This step is called clearing fractions.

== Rule of three ==
The rule of three was a historical shorthand version for a particular form of cross-multiplication that could be taught to students by rote. It was considered the height of Colonial maths education and still figures in the French national curriculum for secondary education, and in the primary education curriculum of Spain.

For an equation of the form

$$\frac a b = \frac c x,$$

where the variable to be evaluated is in the right-hand denominator, the rule of three states that

$$x = \frac{bc}a.$$

In this context, a is referred to as the extreme of the proportion, and b and c are called the means.

This rule was already known to Chinese mathematicians prior to the 2nd century CE, though it was not used in Europe until much later.

Cocker's Arithmetick, the premier textbook in the 17th century, introduces its discussion of the rule of three with the problem "If 4 yards of cloth cost 12 shillings, what will 6 yards cost at that rate?" The rule of three gives the answer to this problem directly; whereas in modern arithmetic, we would solve it by introducing a variable x to stand for the cost of 6 yards of cloth, writing down the equation

$$\frac{4\ \text{yards}}{12\ \text{shillings}} = \frac{6\ \text{yards}}{x}$$

and then using cross-multiplication to calculate x:

$$x = \frac{12\ \text{shillings} \times 6\ \text{yards}}{4\ \text{yards}} = 18\ \text{shillings}.$$

An anonymous manuscript dated 1570 said: "Multiplication is vexation, / Division is as bad; / The Rule of three doth puzzle me, / And Practice drives me mad."

Charles Darwin refers to his use of the rule of three in estimating the number of species in a newly discerned genus. In a letter to William Darwin Fox in 1855, Charles Darwin declared “I have no faith in anything short of actual measurement and the Rule of Three.” Karl Pearson adopted this declaration as the motto of his newly founded journal Biometrika.

=== Double rule of three ===
An extension to the rule of three was the double rule of three, which involved finding an unknown value where five rather than three other values are known.

An example of such a problem might be If 6 builders can build 8 houses in 100 days, how many days would it take 10 builders to build 20 houses at the same rate?, and this can be set up as

$$\frac{\frac{8\ \text{houses}}{100\ \text{days}}}{6\ \text{builders}} = \frac{\frac{20\ \text{houses}}{x}}{10\ \text{builders}},$$

which, with cross-multiplication twice, gives

$$x = \frac{20\ \text{houses} \times 100\ \text{days} \times 6\ \text{builders}}{8\ \text{houses} \times 10\ \text{builders}} = 150\ \text{days}.$$

Lewis Carroll's "The Mad Gardener's Song" includes the lines "He thought he saw a Garden-Door / That opened with a key: / He looked again, and found it was / A double Rule of Three".

== See also ==
- Cross-ratio
- Odds ratio
- Trairāśika
- Turn (angle)
- Unitary method
