= Dadhigrama =

Village in Maharashtra, India

Dadhigrama was a village on the banks of the Payosni river in Vidarbha where a school of mathematics and astronomy flourished during the 14th to 19th centuries CE.

Some of the well-known members of the school were Cintāmani, a Brahmana of the Devaratragotra, in the middle of the 15th century, Rama (who was patronized by a king of Vidarbha), Trimalla, Vallala, Munisvara, a grandson of Vallala, his son Rama, who wrote a commentary on the Sudhārasasāranī of Ananta (fl. 1525), and Ḳrshnạ (fl. 1600–1625). Ranganatha (fl. 1603), another astronomer of the school, wrote Gūḍhārthaprakāśikā, a commentary on the Suryasidhanta.

== Known members of the Dadhigrama school of mathematics ==
The known members of this school include the following:

- Rama (Sons: Trimalla, Gopiraja)
- Trimalla (Son: Vallala)
- Vallal (Sons: Rama, Krishna, Govinda, Ranganatha, Mahadeva)
- Govinda (Son: Narayana)
- Ranganatha (Son: Munisvara)

== Schools of mathematics ==
Historians of mathematics have identified several schools of mathematics that flourished in different parts of India during the 14th–19th centuries CE. It has also been noted that most of the mathematical activities during this period were concentrated in these schools. The schools were at places identified by the following names:

- Jambusagaranagara
- Dadhigrama (Vidarbha)
- Nandigrama (Maharashtra)
- Parthapura (Maharashtra)
- Golagrama (Maharashtra)
- Kerala
