= Avadhesh Narayan Singh =

Indian mathematician (1901-1954)

Avadhesh Narayan Singh (Benares, 1901 – July 10, 1954) was an Indian mathematician and historian of mathematics.

Singh received a master's degree from Banaras Hindu University in his hometown (Varanasi was then called Banaras or Benares) in 1924, where he was a student of Ganesh Prasad. He received his DSc in mathematics from the University of Calcutta in 1929 for his dissertation titled "Derivation and Non-Differentiable functions". After securing a DSc, Singh went to Lucknow University, where he became a Reader in 1940 and a professor in 1943. There he opened a Hindu Mathematics section and revived the nearly defunct Banaras Mathematical Society under the name of Bharata Ganita Parisad. In the 1930s he wrote a history of Indian mathematics with Bibhutibhushan Datta, which became a standard work. As a mathematician, he dealt with non-differentiable functions (an example of an everywhere non-differentiable function is the Weierstrass function).

== Publications ==
Singh published about a dozen papers related to the history of Indian mathematics, and three dozen papers related to the non-differentiability of functions. He also published the following two books:

- "The Theory and Construction of Non-Differentiable Functions", Lucknow University Studies No. I, 1935. (accessed on 2 August 2023).
- Bibhuti Bhushan Datta and Avadhesh Narayan Singh (1935). A History of Hindu Mathematics: A Source Book (Part I Numerical Notation and Arithmetic) (First ed.). Lahore: Motilal Banarsidass.
- Bibhuti Bhushan Datta and Avadhesh Narayan Singh (1938). A History of Hindu Mathematics: A Source Book (Part II Algebra) (First ed.). Lahore: Motilal Banarsi Das.

Volume 3 of the "History of Hindu Mathematics" was edited by Kripa Shankar Shukla and published in several papers in the Indian Journal of History of Science (Vol. 5, 1980 to Vol. 28, 1993). These edited papers are available in the Studies in Indian Mathematics and Astronomy (Selected Articles of Kripa Shankar Shukla).
