= Bibhutibhushan Datta =

Indian historian of mathematics (1888-1958)

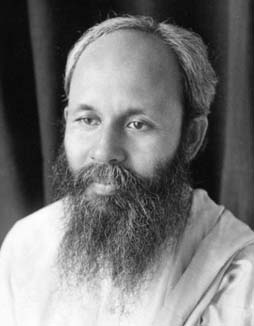
Bibhutibhushan Datta

Bibhutibhushan Datta (Bengali: বিভূতিভূষণ দত্ত, romanized: Bibhūtibhūṣaṇ Datta; also Bibhuti Bhusan Datta; 28 June 1888 – 6 October 1958) was a historian of Indian mathematics.

Datta came from a poor Bengali family. He was a student of Ganesh Prasad, studied at the University of Calcutta and secured a master's degree in mathematics in 1914 and a doctorate degree in 1920 in applied mathematics. He taught at Calcutta University where he was a lecturer at the University Science College, and from 1924 to 1929 he was the Rhashbehari Ghosh Professor of Applied Mathematics. During the 1920s and 1930s he created a reputation as an authority on the history of Indian mathematics. He was also deeply interested in Indian philosophy and religion. In 1929 he retired from his professorship and left the university in 1933, and became a sannyasin (an ascetic, a person who has renounced worldly pleasures) in 1938 under the name Swami Vidyaranya.

History of Hindu Mathematics: A Source Book, written by him jointly with Avadhesh Narayan Singh (1901–1954) became a standard reference work in the history of Indian mathematics. He also wrote a monograph on the Shulba Sutras. He published more than 70 research papers mostly related to the history of Indian mathematics.

In the last years of his life, as Swami Vidyaranya, he lived mainly at Pushkar, a Hindu holy site in Rajasthan.

== See also ==
- History of Hindu Mathematics: A Source Book, Datta's magnum opus on Hindu (Indic) mathematics
