= Chalisgaon–Dhule line =

Railway line in Maharashtra, India

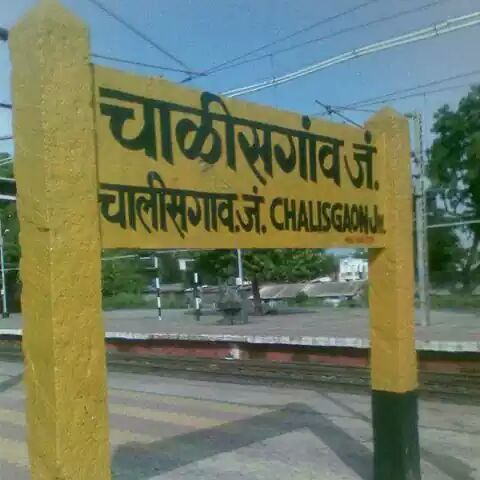
- Chalisgaon Junction the starting point of Chalisgaon–Dhule line

Overview
- Status: Operational
- Owner: Indian Railways
- Locale: Maharashtra
- Termini: Chalisgaon Junction; Dhule Terminus
- Stations: Bhoras Budruk, Jamda, Rajmane, Mordad Tanda, Shirud, Borvihir, Mohadi Pargane, Dhule Terminus.

Service
- Type: Branch line
- System: Electric loco system
- Operator(s): Central Railway

History
- Opened: 15 August 1900; 125 years ago

Technical
- Track length: 56 km (35 mi)
- Number of tracks: 1 (single)
- Track gauge: 5 ft 6 in (1,676 mm) broad gauge
- Operating speed: 44 km/h

The Chalisgaon–Dhule line is a railway route in Maharashtra, India.

== History ==
The Chalisgaon–Dhule line was opened in 1900, serving between Chalisgaon and Dhule in Jalgaon and Dhule district in the Indian state of Maharashtra. The total length of this section is 56 km (35 mi), which includes a total of 7 stations. The line includes a single-line system, with traction of electric.

== Electrification ==
The Chalisgaon Junction to Dhule terminus track electrification is completed.

== Routing ==
The 51111/51112 Chalisgaon–Dhule Passenger runs via Bhoras Budruk, Jamda, Rajmane, Mordad Tanda, Shirud, Mohadi Pargane Laling, Dhule terminus.

== Trains ==
Trains between Chalisgaon Junction and Dhule terminus as follows:

Train No.	Train name	Destinations
51111 / 51112	Chalisgaon–Dhule Passenger	Chalisgaon Junction–Dhule terminus.
