= Chalisgaon =

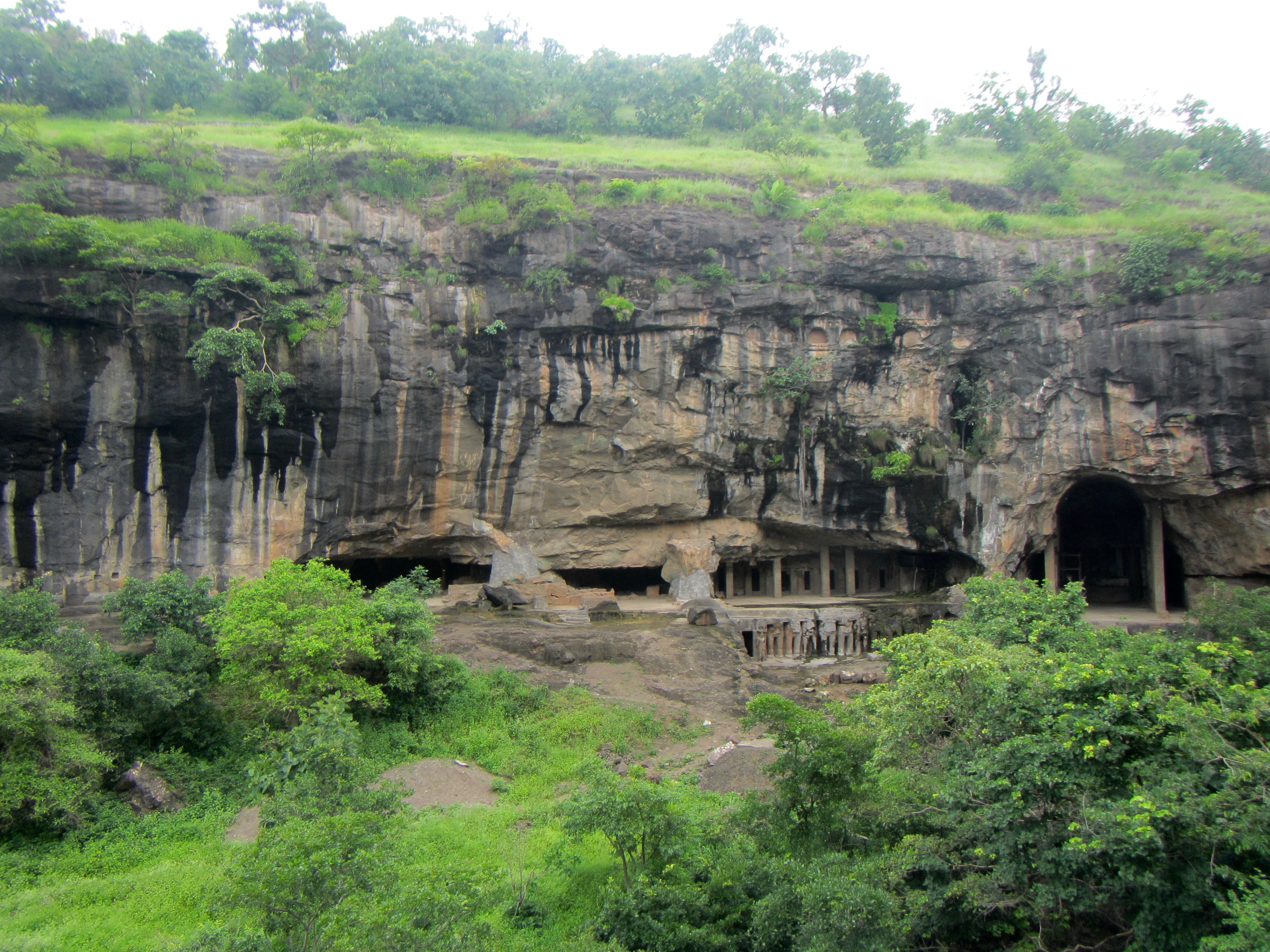
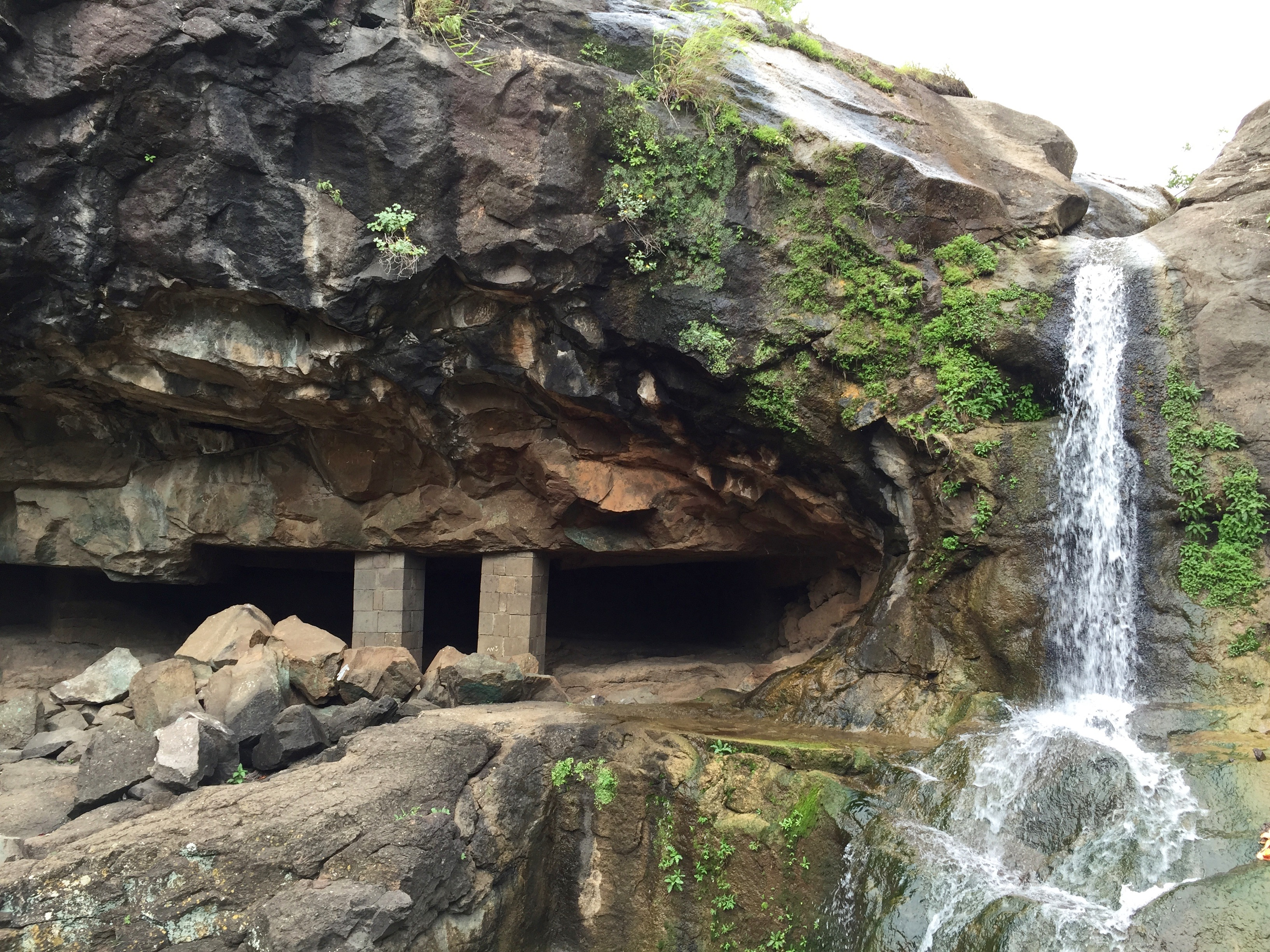
- Interactive map of Chalisgaon
- Country: India
- State: Maharashtra
- District: Jalgaon

Government
  - Type: Municipal Council
  - Body: Chalisgaon Municipal Council
  - MLA: Mangesh Ramesh Chavan
- Elevation: 344 m (1,129 ft)

Population (2011)
  - Total: 97,551
- Demonym: Chalisgaonkar

Languages
  - Official: Marathi
  - Speaking: Marathi, Ahirani
- Time zone: UTC+5:30 (IST)
- PIN: 424101
- Telephone code: 91-2589
- Vehicle registration: MH-52

Chalisgaon (चाळीसगाव) is second largest city and municipal council in Jalgaon district of the Indian state of Maharashtra. It is located in the Khandesh division of the state. and is located about 100 km (62 miles) from Jalgaon and about 330 km (210 miles) from Maharashtra's capital Mumbai. It serves as the administrative headquarters for the Chalisgaon taluka (sub-district). Situated on the banks of the Tittur and Dongri River, Chalisgaon serves as a major commercial, agricultural, and transportation hub connecting the Khandesh region with Marathwada and Western Maharashtra.

== Etymology ==
The name Chalisgaon is derived from the Marathi words Chalis (meaning "forty") and Gaon (meaning "village"). According to local historical accounts and regional folklore, the town was formed during the medieval or early colonial period by merging a cluster of forty smaller surrounding villages into a single administrative unit.

== History ==
=== Ancient and Early Medieval Period ===
- Early Dynasties (4th–8th Century CE): The region surrounding Chalisgaon was successively governed by early regional empires, including the Satavahanas, the Western Chalukyas, and the Rashtrakuta dynasty.
- Mundakhede and Mehunbare Copper Plates (680–702 CE): Important epigraphic records found within the taluka, such as the Mundakhede plates (dated Saka 602 / 680 CE) and the Mehunbare plates (dated Saka 624 / 702 CE), verify that local chieftains under the Western Chalukyas ruled parts of the Chalisgaon area, donating regional villages for religious and scholarly purposes.
- Waghli Architectural Heritage: The nearby village of Waghli features ancient temple ruins (including the Mudhai Devi temple complex) that date back to the early medieval era, highlighting the early urbanization of the sub-district.

=== Medieval Era and the Yadava Dynasty ===
- The Yadava Kingdom and Nikumbha Feudatories (11th–13th Century CE): During the zenith of the Yadava Dynasty of Devagiri, the Chalisgaon region gained immense strategic prominence. The area was locally administered by the Nikumbha branch of feudatory kings, who controlled the vital trade routes through the surrounding Satmala and Sahyadri mountain passes.
- Patnadevi as a Medieval Hub: The ancient settlement of Patna (modern-day Patnadevi) flourished as a prominent political, commercial, and cultural capital. The Nikumbha rulers commissioned the construction of the black-stone Chandika Devi Temple here in the 11th century, utilizing the classic Hemadpanti architectural style.
- Residency of Bhaskaracharya: In the 12th century, Patnadevi became an internationally renowned seat of scientific learning. The legendary Indian mathematician and astronomer Bhaskaracharya (Bhaskara II) resided in an ashram in Patnadevi. Sponsored by the imperial court of the Yadavas, he authored his mathematical and astronomical magnum opus, the Siddhanta Shiromani, at this site.

=== Sultanate, Maratha, and British Colonial Rule ===
- Islamic Sultanates (14th–17th Century CE): Following the invasion of the Deccan by Alauddin Khalji in the early 14th century, the Yadava kingdom collapsed. Chalisgaon subsequently came under the administration of the Delhi Sultanate, the Farooqui dynasty of Khandesh, and later the Mughal Empire.
- Maratha Expansion (18th Century CE): The region was integrated into the Maratha Empire during the expansionist era of the Peshwas. Historical records note that Peshwa Bajirao I led his cavalry forces through Chalisgaon in December 1736 during his military march toward Delhi.
- British East India Company (1818 CE): Following the defeat of the Holkar regime and the Peshwa in the Third Anglo-Maratha War, the British East India Company captured the Khandesh division. Chalisgaon was placed under the administrative jurisdiction of the Khandesh District, headquartered at Dhule.
- District Division (1906 CE): For administrative convenience, the British government split the vast region into two distinct administrative units. Chalisgaon was assigned to the East Khandesh District, while Dhule became the seat for West Khandesh.

=== Post-Independence Era ===
- State Reorganisation Act (1956 CE): Following India's independence in 1947, East Khandesh initially remained a part of the massive, bilingual Bombay State. In 1956, borders were adjusted under the States Reorganisation Act to match regional linguistic distributions.
- Formation of Maharashtra (1960 CE): On 1 May 1960, the Bombay State was formally bifurcated. The East Khandesh district was renamed Jalgaon district and integrated into the newly established Marathi-speaking state of Maharashtra. Chalisgaon was officially designated as one of the fifteen primary administrative talukas (sub-districts) of the restructured district, growing into its current status as a major regional municipal council.

== Geography ==
Chalisgaon is located at 20.47°N 75.02°E. It has an average elevation of 344 metres (1128 feet). It is situated around hills and the banks of the Titur River. The surrounding area is spread by wildlife forest. The geography of Chalisgaon taluka is heavily defined by its proximity to the Satmala mountain range, an integral branch of the Sahyadri (Western Ghats) system that borders the sub-district to the south and separates the Tapi River basin from the Godavari basin. The city itself is built on the banks of the Dongri River (historically referred to as the Titur River), which serves as the primary local water body and drainage system for the urban area before feeding into the larger Girna River network.

== Climate ==
Chalisgaon experiences a local steppe climate (Köppen climate classification: BSh), which is characterized by hot, dry summers and general dryness throughout the year, except during the monsoon season.

- Summer: The hot season lasts from April to early June, with May being the warmest month. Average daily high temperatures routinely exceed 40 °C (104 °F), occasionally peaking up to 42 °C (108 °F) under severe heatwave conditions.
- Monsoon: The southwest monsoon brings the wet season from mid-June through September. The skies remain mostly cloudy during this period, with the region receiving its highest average monthly precipitation in July.
- Winter: A dry and pleasant winter sets in by November and lasts until February. December is typically the coolest month, with average nighttime low temperatures dropping to around 15 °C (59 °F).

== Demographics ==
According to the official 2011 Census of India, demographics vary between the Chalisgaon urban municipal area and the broader rural sub-district (taluka).

=== Chalisgaon Sub-District (Taluka) ===
The entire Chalisgaon taluka had a total population of 414,879, residing across 86,332 households.

- Gender Distribution: The population included 217,321 males and 197,558 females. This yields an overall sub-district sex ratio of 909 females per 1,000 males.
- Child Population: Children aged 0–6 numbered 54,153, with a child sex ratio of 836 females per 1,000 males.
- Literacy: The overall literacy rate for the entire sub-district was 65.72%, with a total of 272,655 literate individuals.

=== Chalisgaon City (Municipal Council) ===
The urban area administered by the Chalisgaon Municipal Council recorded a population of 97,551, consisting of 50,737 males and 46,814 females.

- Sex Ratio: The urban sex ratio stands at 929 females per 1,000 males, which aligns closely with the Maharashtra state average of 929. The urban child sex ratio (ages 0–6) was recorded at 846.
- Literacy Rate: Chalisgaon City has a high average literacy rate of 85.88%, which exceeds the Maharashtra state average of 82.34%. Male literacy in the city stands at 90.41%, while female literacy stands at 81.02%.

=== Languages ===
The official language of administration and the primary medium of communication in Chalisgaon is Marathi. However, due to its geographic position in the Khandesh region, the Ahirani language (a major dialect of Khandeshi) is widely spoken by the local population in everyday life. Standard Hindi and English are also common in commercial and educational environments.

Year	Male	Female	Total Population	Change	Religion (%)							
Year	Male	Female	Total Population	Change	Hindu	Muslim	Christian	Sikhs	Buddhist	Jain	Other religions and persuasions	Religion not stated
2001	47629	43481	91110	-	80.029	15.250	0.156	0.060	2.107	1.717	0.031	0.651
2011	50737	46814	97551	0.071	80.765	16.131	0.159	0.037	1.240	1.410	0.005	0.253

== Economy and Infrastructure ==
The economy of Chalisgaon is primarily driven by agriculture, agro-based industries, and regional trade. Due to its strategic location in the fertile Khandesh belt, the city acts as a major commercial hub for surrounding rural areas.

- Agriculture and APMC Market: The Chalisgaon Agricultural Produce Market Committee (APMC) is one of the largest and most prominent market yards in the Jalgaon district. The region is a massive producer of cotton, maize (corn), and oilseeds. The local market operates a high volume of cotton ginning, pressing, and trading tivities, making it a critical trading post for textile manufacturers across Maharashtra.
- Industrial Development (MIDC): The Maharashtra Industrial Development Corporation (MIDC) has established a dedicated industrial area in Chalisgaon. This zone hosts various small to medium-scale enterprises (SMEs), specializing in textile manufacturing, oil extraction, cattle feed production, and engineering goods.
- Infrastructure and Utilities: Water supply to Chalisgaon city is managed by the local municipal council, drawing water primarily from regional reservoirs like the Girna Dam network. The city features public healthcare facilities, including a government rural hospital, alongside private multi-specialty centers.

== Transport ==
Chalisgaon is a critical transport intersection, well-connected to major urban centers in Maharashtra by both rail and road networks.

=== Railways ===
Chalisgaon Junction railway station (station code: CSN) is a vital railway hub under the Bhusawal division of the Central Railway zone of Indian Railways.

- It is situated on the primary Mumbai–Bhusawal–Howrah main line.
- The junction serves as the origin point for the branch line running south towards Dhule.
- It handles a high volume of daily passenger, express, and freight trains, providing direct connectivity to major cities like Mumbai, Pune, Kolkata, Delhi, and Ahmedabad.

=== Roads ===
Chalisgaon acts as a major highway junction connecting North Maharashtra with the Marathwada and Western Maharashtra regions.

- The city is connected via major routes including State Highway 211 (historically linking Dhule to Solapur via Aurangabad), which funnels traffic across the Satmala hill range via the Outram Ghat.
- A robust network of Maharashtra State Road Transport Corporation (MSRTC) buses operates from the Chalisgaon central bus station, offering frequent, direct inter-city services to Jalgaon, Dhule, Nashik, Aurangabad, and Pune.

== Places of Interest ==
- Patnadevi: Located inside the reserved woodlands of the Gautala Autramghat Sanctuary, Patnadevi is a highly revered historical and religious hamlet. It features the ancient Chandika Devi Temple, built in the classic black-stone Hemadpanti architectural style. The site is historically significant as the workplace of the 12th-century mathematician and astronomer Bhaskaracharya, who set up a research ashram here.
- Gautala Autramghat Sanctuary: Spanning across the Satmala hill range, this protected wildlife sanctuary borders the southern edge of Chalisgaon taluka. It acts as an ecological haven, home to leopards, sloth bears, barking deer, and diverse bird species. The sanctuary is a popular spot for ecotourism, particularly during the monsoon season when its waterfalls (such as Sitakhori) are fully active.
- Local Historic Temples: Chalisgaon city and its surrounding villages house several notable places of worship, including the historic Mudhai Devi temple complex in nearby Waghli, the Kedareshwar Temple, and the heavily visited local Hanuman temples.

=== Nearby Regional Attractions ===
Due to its position as a major transit hub on the border of the Khandesh and Marathwada regions, Chalisgaon serves as an accessible base for several UNESCO World Heritage Sites and major pilgrimage networks located just across the district border in the Chhatrapati Sambhajinagar (Aurangabad) district.

- Ellora Caves: A world-famous UNESCO World Heritage Site featuring a massive complex of 34 rock-cut monasteries and temples carved out of the Charanandri hills. It spans Hindu, Buddhist, and Jain traditions, and is home to the monumental rock-cut Kailasanatha Temple (Cave 16).
- Grishneshwar Temple: Situated immediately adjacent to the Ellora Caves, the Grishneshwar Jyotirlinga Temple is historically significant as the twelfth and final Jyotirlinga shrine dedicated to Lord Shiva. The temple features red-volcanic stone architecture restored by Ahilyabai Holkar in the 18th century.
- Ajanta Caves: A world-renowned UNESCO World Heritage Site comprising 30 rock-cut Buddhist cave monuments dating from the 2nd century BCE to about 480 CE. The site is internationally celebrated for its masterful ancient Indian murals and expressive fresco paintings depicting the Jataka tales.
- Pitalkhora Caves: The earliest rock-cut Buddhist cave complex in the Indian subcontinent, located deep within a dramatic ravine in the Satmala range. The site consists of 14 early Hinayana caves featuring ancient stupas, sculptures, and monastic cells.

== See also ==
- Chalisgaon Railway Station
- Chalisgaon - Dhule Railway Line
- Dhule Terminus
