= Bombay Flying Club =

- Type: Society
- Established: 28 May 1928; 98 years ago
- Accreditation: Directorate General of Civil Aviation (DGCA)
- Affiliation: University of Mumbai
- President: Mihir D. Bhagvati
- Principal: C. Kumar
- Address: Juhu Aerodrome, Mumbai, Maharashtra, 400056, India
- Website: thebombayflyingclub.com

The Bombay Flying Club is the oldest flying club in India, established in 1928, located at Juhu aerodrome, Mumbai. At present, the Bombay Flying Club's College of Aviation offers programs such as pilot training, Aircraft Maintenance Engineer, and cabin crew, approved by the Directorate General of Civil Aviation (DGCA), and also BSc Aviation and BSc Aeronautics programs with affiliation from the University of Mumbai.

== History ==
Bombay Flying Club was incorporated on 29 May 1928, and commenced instruction on 13 January 1929 when they received their first two De Havilland Moth aircraft, presented to them by the Government of India. A third aircraft, a D.H. Moth (Gipsy), was won by the Club as a prize offered by Sir Charles Wakefield to the first Indian flying club which should turn out 12 qualified pilots, of whom at least six were to be Indians. The Club used these aircraft for tuition, joy-rides, and air travel. The activities of the club were, unfortunately, limited by the fact that the aerodrome at Juhu was not suitable during the monsoon. This problem was solved by 1937. The Club received its licence to build a hangar and garages at the aerodrome on 17 August 1931.

JRD Tata, the father of Indian civil aviation, who received India's first pilot's licence, trained at this club in 1929. Lady Dinshaw Petit, his sister, became the first female to obtain a pilot licence in India.

== Current status ==
It currently owns one Cessna 152 Aerobat, five Cessna 172s of which one is equipped with a Garmin G1000 glass cockpit, a twin engine Piper PA-34 Seneca and one Piper Super Cub PA-18. The Club shifted part of its training operations to Dhule Airport near the town of Dhule in 2009 to avoid the congested air-space of Mumbai. The Club leased the airstrip from the Maharashtra Airport Development Company in order to carry out its training activities without any restrictions. Despite the city's change of name, the club retains the old name; however, the flying training, hobby flying and members' flying continues at Juhu airport at Mumbai too.
