= Karana-kutuhala =

1183 CE Sanskrit-language book on jyotisha (astrology and astronomy) by Bhaskara II

- Author: Bhaskara II
- Original title: करणकुतूहल
- Language: Sanskrit
- Subject: jyotisha (astrology and astronomy)
- Genre: karana (concise exposition of astronomy)
- Published: 1183 CE
- Publication place: ancient India
- Preceded by: Siddhanta Shiromani

Karana-kutuhala (IAST: Karaṇakutūhala) is a 1183 CE Sanskrit-language book on jyotisha (astrology and astronomy) by Bhaskara II, a mathematician-astronomer from present-day India.

== Date and authorship ==
Bhaskara II wrote Karana-kutuhala (literally, "Calculation of Astronomical Wonders") in 1183 CE.

Alternative titles for Karana-kutuhala include Karaṇakutūhalam, Khetakarma, Graha-gama-kutuhala, Brahma-tulya, and Vidagdha-buddhi-vallabha. As the name suggests, the book is a karana text, that is, a concise exposition of astronomy. Bhaskara's Karana-kutuhala was followed by Indian astronomers for several centuries, during which no other karana text was produced, until Ganesha composed Graha-laghava or Siddhanta-rahasya in the early 16th century.

The text was popular in west and north-west India, and survives in form of over 150 manuscripts.

== Contents ==
Karana-kutuhala condenses and approximates many computational formulae from Bhaskara's earlier work, the Siddhanta Shiromani, in accordance with the Brahma-paksha sunrise-epoch astronomical school. It uses the epoch of sunrise on 23-24 February 1183 of the Julian calendar (1 Chaitra Shaka 1105).

The text contains following chapters:

- Nabhoga-madhya-sadhana
- Sphuta-kriya
- Tri-prashna
- Sashanka-parva-sadhana
- Ravi-graha-sadhana
- Grahodayashta-sadhana
- Shrngonnatipra-sadhana
- Grahottha-yoga-sadhana
- Pata-sadhana
- Ravindu-parva-sambhava
- Niradarka-vichara

== Commentaries and derivative texts ==
Several later writers composed commentaries on the Karana-kutuhala. These include:

- Brahma-tulya-bhashya (c. 1370) by Ekanatha, at Mahandanagara, probably in west India
- Narmadi (c. 1400) by Padmanabha, probably in west India
- Karana-kutuhala-tika (before 1462) by Sodhala
- Brahma-tulyodaharana (1612) by Vishvanatha, at Varanasi
- Ganaka-kumuda-kaumudi (1621) by Sumati-harsha Gani, near Vindhyadri
- Karana-kutuhala-tika (before 1658) by Chandi-dasa

Brahmatulya-sarani (literally "Tables of/for the Brahmatulya"), an anonymous Sanskrit text from the 16th or the 17th century, contains astronomical tables and versified instructions based primarily on the Karana-kutuhala.

A critical edition of the text by Madhava Shastri Purohita, with Sumati-harsha's commentary, was published in 1901.
