= Patnadevi =

Patna Devi (Chandika Devi) temple
- पाटणादेवी
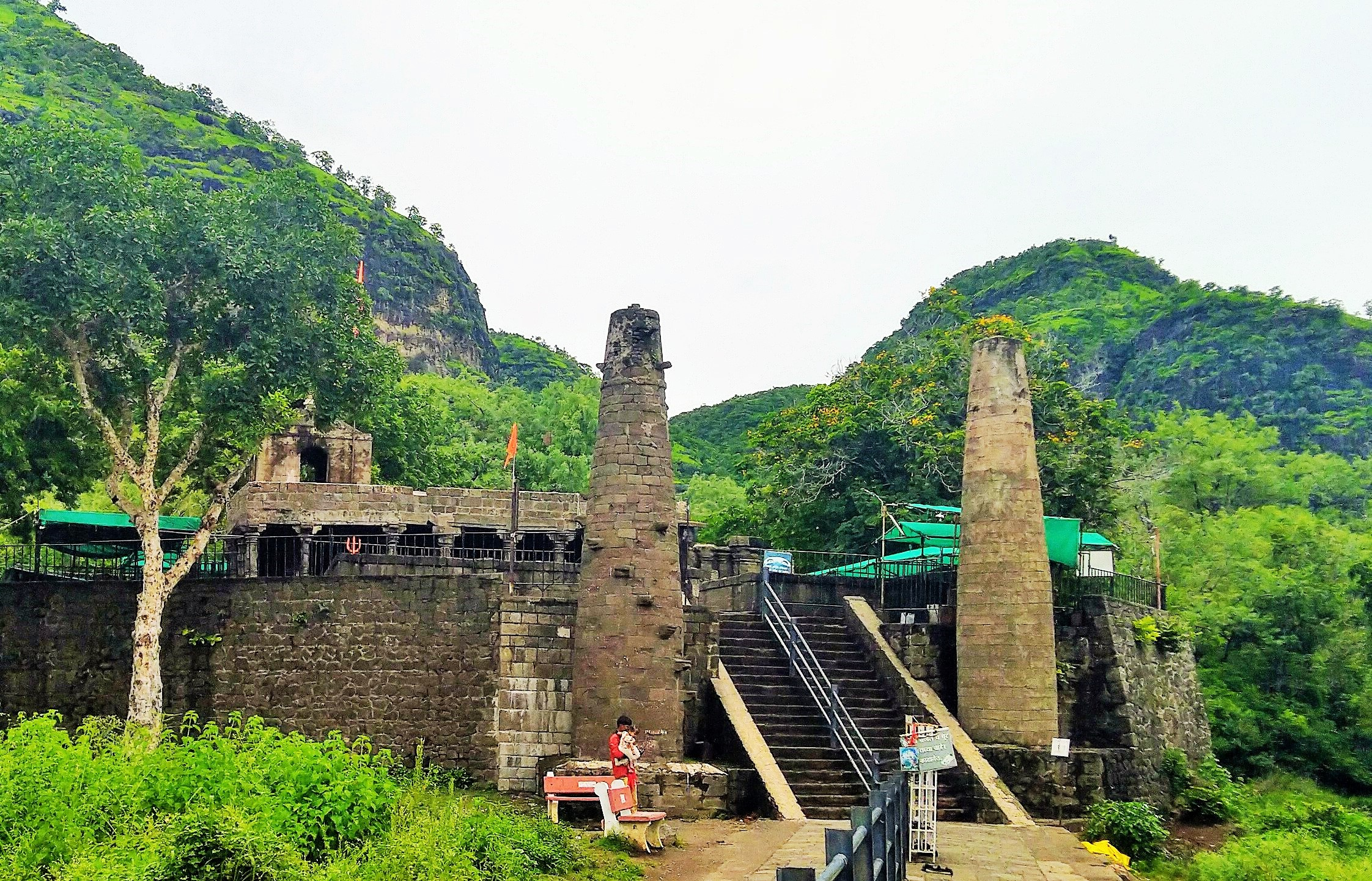
- Chandika Devi Temple

- Location in Maharashtra

Religion
- Affiliation: Hinduism
- District: Jalgaon
- Deity: Devi

Location
- Location: chalisgaon
- State: Maharashtra
- Country: India
- Interactive map of Patna Devi (Chandika Devi) temple
- Coordinates: 20.330030°N 74.967424°E

Architecture
- Creator: Yadavrao Kheunchandra and Govindraj Mourya
- Completed: Year 1150
- Temple: 2

Patanadevi is a historic and tourist place situated 18 km to the southwest of Chalisgaon, Maharashtra. It lies inside Gautala Autramghat Sanctuary and is surrounded by the high mountains of Sahyadri.

It consists of Chandika Devi Temple and Hemadpanthi Mahadev Temple.

== History ==
In earlier days, this was a capital of an important Province called Patna (Vijjalgad). It was ruled by the former monarch at the state of the Yadav kings and their tributary. This capital city was 4–5 miles in length and width at the time. The city was surrounded by high mountain-like walls, and it was very beautiful because of the surrounding forest. In the surrounding forest there were different kinds of fruit trees, and there was a highway. Water was supplied to the city by digging water tanks on the high part of the mountain. The city has been famous for trade, art, learning, traffic and temples since the Shalivahan Saka period due to its metal mines and various vegetation on the hills. At that time, the Mandlik kings of Yadav built Siddheshwar Temple at Waghli (Year 991), Shardadevi Temple at Bahal (Year 1944) and Chandika Devi Temple at Patna (Year 1128).

== Bhaskaracharya ==
Bhaskaracharya or Bhaskara II was a 12th-century Indian mathematician. He was also a renowned astronomer of that time. He lived in the a Aashram in Patnadevi. He is said to have written his famous magnum opus, Siddhanta Shiromani, in Patnadevi.

== Importance and status ==
The Chadika Mata of Patnadevi is the Kul-Devta of many Hindu castes and tribes. Even today, in the Kuladharma Kulachara (a ritual), many devotees carry rice for puja in remembrance of Bhagwati from Dhawaltirtha.
