= Chalisgaon–Dhule Passenger =

Train in India

Chalisgaon Dhule Passenger
Overview
- Service type: Passenger
- Current operator: Central Railways

Route
- Termini: Chalisgaon Junction; Dhule Terminus
- Stops: 7
- Distance travelled: 56 km (35 mi)
- Average journey time: 1 hours 15 minutes
- Service frequency: daily
- Train number: 51115 / 51116

On-board services
- Class: General Unreserved
- Seating arrangements: Yes
- Sleeping arrangements: No
- Catering facilities: No Pantry Car attached
- Other facilities: No

Technical
- Rolling stock: Standard Indian Railways coaches
- Track gauge: Broad Gauge

The 51115/51116 Chalisgaon Dhule Passenger is an Indian passenger train service in the state of Maharashtra, operated by Indian Railways. It runs from Chalisgaon Junction to Dhule Terminus.

It operates as train number 51115 from Chalisgaon Junction to Dhule Terminus and as train number 51116 in the reverse direction.

== Service ==
Chalisgaon Dhule Passenger has a total of 7 stops between Chalisgaon Junction to Dhule Terminus and covers a distance of 56 km. in 1 hour and 15 minutes. It is operated by the Bhusawal division of Central Railway.

== Routeing ==
The 51115/16 Chalisgaon Dhule Passenger runs via Bhoras Budruk, Jamda, Rajmane, Mordad Tanda, Shirud, Mohadi Pargane Laling, to Dhule Terminus.

== See also ==
- Indian Railways
