= Alwadi =

Village in Maharashtra

- Village
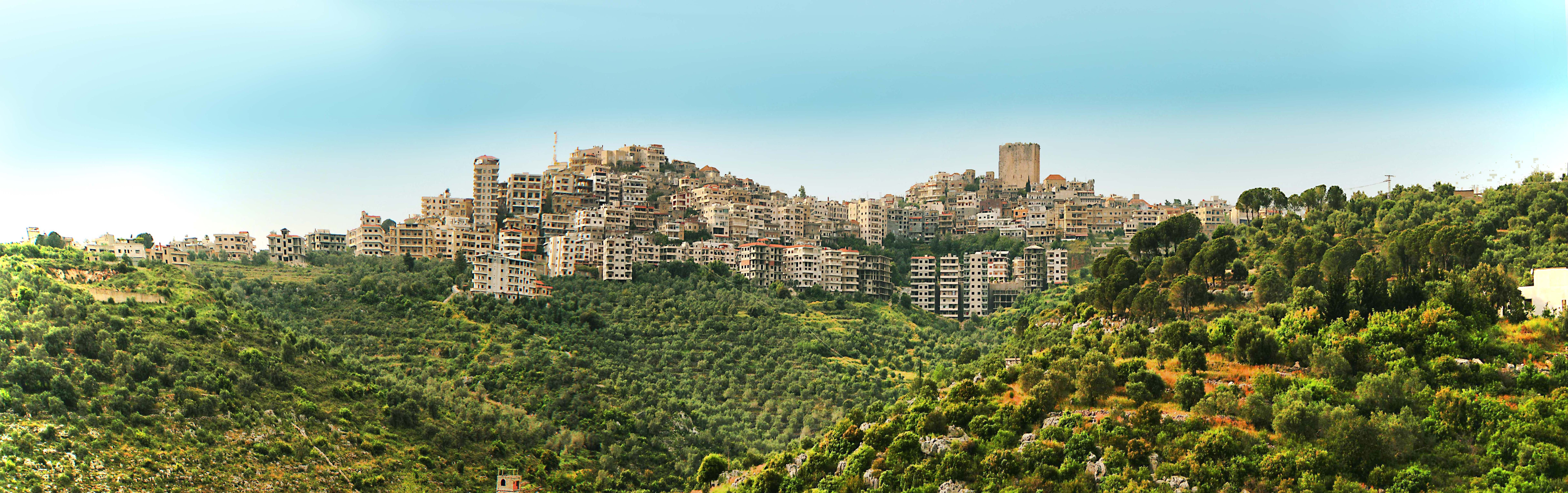
- from southern valley

- Location in Maharashtra, India Alwadi (India)
- Coordinates: 20.4952052°N 74.8192978°E
- Country: India
- State: Maharashtra
- District: Jalgaon
- Taluka: Chalisgaon

Population (2001)
  - Total: 1,400

Languages
  - Official: Marathi
- Time zone: UTC+5:30 (IST)
- PIN: 424101
- Telephone code: 91-2589
- Vehicle registration: MH19

Alwadi is a village in Chalisgaon taluka of Jalgaon district in the state of Maharashtra, India.

== Geography ==
It has an average elevation of 344 metres (1128 feet). It is also located near the Manyar Dam, and a canal off of the dam provides irrigation for the village.

== Economy ==
Sugarcane is the major agricultural product and is the basis for the local sugar refining and rum distilling industries. Other major crops include cotton, groundnuts, onion, banana, wheat, gram, and other vegetables and grains (bajra, jovar, tur etc.).

== Transport ==
=== Rail ===
The nearest railway station is in Chalisgaon, about 22 kilometres (14 mi) from Alwadi.

=== Road ===
Alwadi is about 39 km from National Highway 3 and 23 km from state highway 211. A state transport bus is available from Chalisgaon to Alwadi. Private vehicles are also available from Takali and Saygaon.
