= Bhāskara II =

Indian mathematician and astronomer (1114–1185)

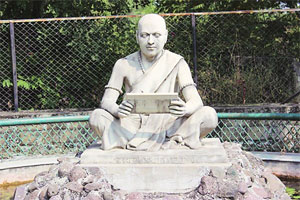
- Statue of Bhaskara II at Patnadevi
- Born: c. 1114; Vijjadavida, Maharashtra (probably Patan in Khandesh or Beed in Marathwada)
- Died: c. 1185 (aged 70–71); Ujjain, Madhya Pradesh
- Other name: Bhāskarācārya
- Occupations: Astronomer, mathematician
- Known for: Bhaskara's lemma, Chakravala method

Academic work
- Era: Shaka era
- Discipline: Mathematician, astronomer, geometer
- Main interests: Algebra, arithmetic, trigonometry
- Notable works: Siddhānta Shiromani; Līlāvatī, Bījagaṇita, Karaṇa-Kautūhala; Grahagaṇita and Golādhyāya

Bhaskara's proof of the Pythagorean Theorem.

Bhāskara II (Note: to avoid confusion with the 7th century mathematician Bhāskara I) ([bʰɑːskərə]; c. 1114–1185), commonly known as Bhāskarāchārya (lit. 'Bhāskara the teacher'), was an Indian polymath, mathematician, and astronomer whose works represent the zenith of the classical Siddhānta school of Jyotiṣa (astronomy and applied mathematics—one of the six Vedāngas or auxiliary disciplines of Vedic scholarship). From verses in his main work, Siddhānta Śiromaṇi, it can be inferred that he was born in 1114 in Vijjadavida (Vijjalavida) and living in the Satamala mountain ranges of Western Ghats, believed to be the town of Patana in Chalisgaon, located in present-day Khandesh region of Maharashtra by scholars. In a temple in Maharashtra, an inscription, supposedly created by his grandson Changadeva, lists Bhaskaracharya's ancestral lineage for several generations before him as well as two generations after him.Henry Colebrooke who was the first European to translate (1817) Bhaskaracharya's mathematical classics refers to the family as Maharashtrian Brahmins residing on the banks of the Godavari.

Born in a Hindu Deshastha Brahmin family lineage of scholars, mathematicians and astronomers, Bhāskara II was the head of the astronomical observatory at Ujjain, the historic reference meridian (madhyarekhā) and premier institutional center of mathematical astronomy in ancient India. Bhāskara and his works represent a significant contribution to mathematical and astronomical knowledge in the 12th century. He has been called the greatest mathematician of medieval India. His main work, Siddhānta-Śiromaṇi (Sanskrit for "Crown of Treatises"), is divided into four parts called Līlāvatī, Bījagaṇita, Grahagaṇita and Golādhyāya, which are also sometimes considered four independent works. These four sections deal with arithmetic, algebra, mathematics of the planets, and spheres respectively. He also wrote another treatise named Karaṇā Kautūhala.

== Date, place and family ==
He belongs from a long line of court scholars, mostly astronomer-astrologers in western India. His grandson Caṅgadeva founded a school in 1207 for the study of Bhāskara’s works, helping to ensure their continued dissemination. His works were also notable for their careful organization, clear exposition, and inclusion of worked examples and solutions.

Bhaskara lived in Patnadevi located near Patan (Chalisgaon) in the vicinity of Sahyadri.

He was born in a Deśastha Rigvedi Brahmin family near Vijjadavida (Vijjalavida). Munishvara (17th century), a commentator on Siddhānta Shiromani of Bhaskara has given the information about the location of Vijjadavida in his work Marīci Tīkā as follows:

सह्यकुलपर्वतान्तर्गत भूप्रदेशे महाराष्ट्रदेशान्तर्गतविदर्भपरपर्यायविराटदेशादपि निकटे गोदावर्यां नातिदूरे

पंचक्रोशान्तरे विज्जलविडम्।

This description locates Vijjalavida in Maharashtra, near the Vidarbha region and close to the banks of Godavari river. However scholars differ about the exact location. Many scholars have placed the place near Patan in Chalisgaon Taluka of Jalgaon district whereas a section of scholars identified it with the modern day Beed city. Some sources identified Vijjalavida as Bijapur or Bidar in Karnataka. Identification of Vijjalavida with Basar in Telangana has also been suggested. However, the identifications suggested by these sources remain untenable.

Bhāskara is said to have been the head of an astronomical observatory at Ujjain, the leading mathematical centre of medieval India. History records his great-great-great-grandfather holding a hereditary post as a court scholar, as did his son and other descendants. His father Maheśvara (Maheśvaropādhyāya) was a mathematician, astronomer and astrologer, who taught him mathematics, which he later passed on to his son Lokasamudra. Lokasamudra's son helped to set up a school in 1207 for the study of Bhāskara's writings. He died in 1185 CE.

== The Siddhānta-Śiromaṇi ==
He wrote the Siddhānta Śiromaṇi (which may be translated as "Crest-jewel of Siddhāntas") in 1150 at the age of 36. It became an important astronomical treatise, even though, since it was an orthodox Brāhmapakṣa work, it did not supplant the canonical texts of the other astronomical traditions. The Siddhānta Śiromaṇi is sometimes said to include the Līlāvatī and Bījagaṇita together with its two astronomical sections, and Bhāskara considered the subjects of these works to be closely related. Yet as the Līlāvatī and Bījagaṇita each have their own titles and were usually transmitted as separate manuscripts, the Siddhānta Śiromaṇi is normally regarded as a separate work concerned with astronomy. The Siddhānta Śiromaṇi consists of two main parts. The first of these, called Grahagaṇita ("planetary calculations"), sets out the methods for calculating the mean and true motions of the planets, the Three Questions, lunar and solar eclipses, and other astronomical phenomena. The second part, known as Golādhyāya, is concerned with spherical astronomy and contains treatments of the celestial sphere, the shape of the sphere, the Earth, topics connected with the gaṇita section, astronomical instruments, the seasons, and questions meant to test the student's knowledge.

=== Līlāvatī ===
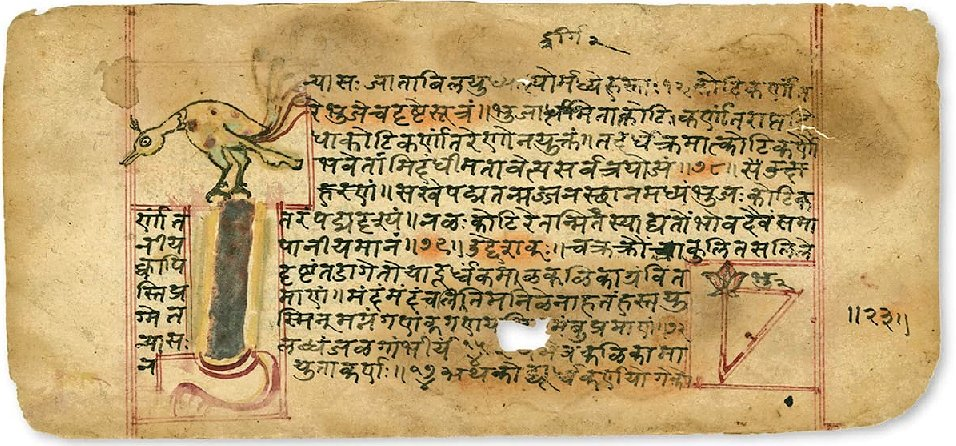
Page from Lilavati, the first volume of Siddhānta Śiromaṇī. Use of the Pythagorean theorem in the corner. 1650 edition

The Līlāvatī, composed by Bhāskara II, is one of the most famous Sanskrit mathematical works, covering a wide range of topics in arithmetic, progressions, geometric measurement, and related mathematical techniques. The title, meaning “Beautiful” or “Playful". While a popular legend—first recorded in 1587 by the Mughal poet Faizi in his persian translation—claims the work was named after Bhāskara's widowed daughter, no contemporary evidence confirms that it was named after her.

Like classical Indian mathematical texts, the work was composed in highly compressed metered Sanskrit verse (padya), designed for memorization, rhythmic recitation, and oral transmission, and were often accompanied by prose commentaries. In Līlāvatī, mathematical problems are addressed playfully to an inquisitive young woman or student using imagery from nature—such as flights of swans, swarms of bees, peacock, and blooming lotuses this also demonstrates the integration of aesthetics and the functional role of mathematics in classical Indian education systems.

=== Bījagaṇita ===
The work known as the Bījagaṇita ("Seed of Computation") was presumably meant to be a more advanced treatise on mathematics than the Līlāvatī. As a result, it has survived in a smaller number of manuscripts and commentaries and seems to have had a narrower readership. It is also distinguished by the small number of works that compete with it, and is considered to be the earliest surviving independent treatise in the Indian mathematical tradition that is entirely devoted to algebra. Similar to the Līlāvatī, it is made up of verses that are continuously numbered and are grouped into sections covering various mathematical subjects; these sections form the basis for the arrangement of the work's mathematical content.

Bījagaṇita contains systematic rules concerning arithmetic operations with positive and negative numbers, zero, unknowns indicated by colours, and surds; it provides methods for solving linear and quadratic equations, indeterminate equations, and equations with more than one unknown, including the pulverizer and the cyclic method for Pell-type equations; the work also examines both negative and positive roots and offers procedures for solving algebraic problems which extend and systematise earlier Indian methods.

=== Grahagaṇita ===
In the third section, Grahagaṇita (451 verses), Bhāskara II treated the instantaneous motion (tātkālika gati) of the planets and distinguished it from their varying apparent motion from their mean motion(madhyama gati). In his astronomical work, Bhāskara gives a result that looks like a precursor to infinitesimal methods:

if $x \approx y$ then $\sin(y) - \sin(x) \approx (y - x)\cos(y)$.

This can be interpreted as the discovery that cosine is the derivative of sine,although he did not develop the notion of a derivative.

He observed that when a planet's apparent motion reaches an extremum("parama phala"), its instantaneous variation becomes zero, an early astronomical recognition of the principle that motion is stationary at an extremum.

In the Grahagaṇita, Bhāskara describes this rule in verse:

'bimbārdhasya koṭijyā guṇastrijyāhāraḥ phalaṃ dorjyāyorantaram

"The product of the cosine of the semi-diameter multiplied by the variation in the anomaly and divided by the radius gives the difference between the two sines."

A related use of Sine differences occurs in Mañjula's astronomical work from the tenth century, the Laghu-mānasa, this text including a highly condensed sine table derived from three "sine-difference" values.

== Mathematics ==
Some of Bhaskara's contributions to mathematics include the following:

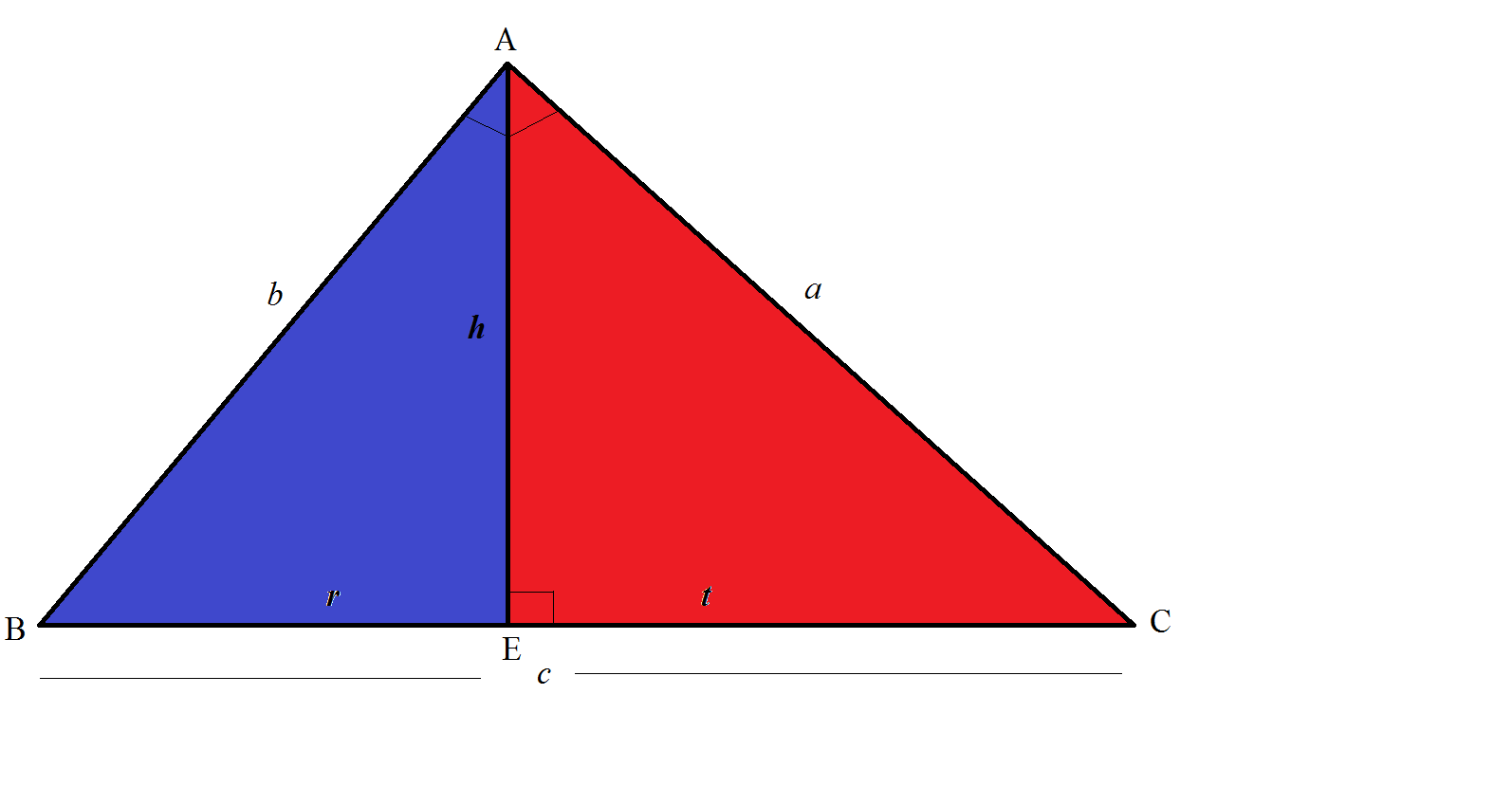
The Bhaskara's first proof of the Pythagorean theorem in Bijaganita

The Bhaskara's second proof of the Pythagorean Theorem in Bijaganita.

- Proofs of the Pythagorean Theorem. In his algebraic treatise Bijaganita, two methods for calculating the hypotenuse of a right triangle are described. These are equivalent to proofs of the Pythagorean Theorem.
  - The first method involves dividing the right triangle using a perpendicular line drawn from the right angle to the hypotenuse, and then applying the principle of similar figures and proportions.(See the figure.)
  - The second method involves calculation of the area of the square on the hypotenuse. First, the square is divided into smaller pieces, one square with side length a-b and four triangles, illustrating the area is $(a-b)^2 + 2ab$. (see the figure on the left.) Here, the length of the hypotenuse is denoted by c, and the lengths of the other two sides are denoted by a and b. Then he computes the hypotenuse of a right angled triangle, where a=15 and b=20. Next, the author states a fact equivalent to$(a-b)^2+2ab=a^2+b^2$, and presents a figure (the figure on the right) as a demonstration. (The figure accompanies no further explanation.) Finally, he presents $c=\sqrt{a^2+b^2}$ as a concise method.
  - In Bījagaṇita and Līlāvatī, Bhāskara II provides geometric and algebraic demonstrations for the relationship between the sides of a right-angled triangle (known in Indian geometry as bhuja (base), koti (altitude) and karna (hypotenuse) from the ancient Śulba Sūtra tradition of Baudhāyana. Rather than relying on deductive axiomatic proofs, Bhāskara offers a visual dissection-and-rearrangement demonstration (kṣetragata-upapatti) for what is known in the West as the Pythagorean property: four congruent right triangles with sides $a$ and $b$ are arranged within a square on the hypotenuse $c$, leaving the central square of side $(a-b)$. This demonstrates the geometric equality: $(a - b)^2 + 2ab = a^2 + b^2 = c^2$accompanied with his famous prompt Paśya ('Behold!').
- Solutions of indeterminate quadratic equations (of the type ax^{2} + b = y^{2}).
- Integer solutions of linear and quadratic indeterminate equations (Kuṭṭaka).
- A cyclic Chakravala method for solving indeterminate equations of the form ax^{2} + bx + c = y. The solution to this equation was traditionally attributed to William Brouncker in 1657, though his method was more difficult than the chakravala method.
- The first general method for finding the solutions of the problem x^{2} − ny^{2} = 1 (so-called "Pell's equation") was given by Bhaskara II.
- Solutions of Diophantine equations of the second order, such as 61x^{2} + 1 = y^{2}. This very equation was posed as a problem in 1657 by the French mathematician Pierre de Fermat, but its solution was unknown in Europe until the time of Euler in the 18th century.
- Stated early form of Rolle's theorem without proof, special case of mean value theorem for inverse interpolation of the sine was later describe by parameshvara through his commentary.
- In Siddhanta-Śiromaṇi, Bhaskara developed spherical trigonometry along with a number of other trigonometric results. (See Trigonometry section below.)

=== Arithmetic ===
Bhaskara's arithmetic text Līlāvatī covers the topics of definitions, arithmetical terms, interest computation, arithmetical and geometrical progressions, plane geometry, solid geometry, the shadow of the gnomon, methods to solve indeterminate equations, and combinations.

Līlāvatī is divided into 13 chapters and covers many branches of mathematics, arithmetic, algebra, geometry, and a little trigonometry and measurement. More specifically the contents include:

- Definitions.
- Properties of zero (including division, and rules of operations with zero).
- Further extensive numerical work, including use of negative numbers and surds.
- Estimation of π.
- Arithmetical terms, methods of multiplication, and squaring.
- Inverse rule of three, and rules of 3, 5, 7, 9, and 11.
- Problems involving interest and interest computation.
- Indeterminate equations (Kuṭṭaka), integer solutions (first and second order).Bhaskara's method of solving was an improvement of the methods found in the work of Aryabhata and subsequent mathematicians.

His work is outstanding for its systematisation, improved methods and the new topics that he introduced. Furthermore, the Lilavati contained excellent problems and it is thought that Bhaskara's intention may have been that a student of 'Lilavati' should concern himself with the mechanical application of the method.

=== Algebra ===
His Bījaganita ("Algebra") was a work in twelve chapters. It was the first text to recognize that a positive number has two square roots (a positive and negative square root). His work Bījaganita is effectively a treatise on algebra and contains the following topics:

- Positive and negative numbers.
- The 'unknown' (includes determining unknown quantities).
- Determining unknown quantities.
- Surds (includes evaluating surds and their square roots).
- Kuṭṭaka (for solving indeterminate equations and Diophantine equations).
- Simple equations (indeterminate of second, third and fourth degree).
- Simple equations with more than one unknown.
- Indeterminate quadratic equations (of the type ax^{2} + b = y^{2}).
- Solutions of indeterminate equations of the second, third and fourth degree.
- Quadratic equations.
- Quadratic equations with more than one unknown.
- Operations with products of several unknowns.

Bhaskara II came up with the first systematic solution for indeterminate quadratic equations like $Nx^2 + 1 = y^2$ (known in Indian mathematics as vargaprakṛti). In Western historiography, it was, anachronistically, known as Pell's equation due to Leonhard Euler's misattribution to John Pell. Using his cyclical algorithm (chakravala method), he helped establish the underlying principles of bhāvanā rules introduced earlier by Brahmagupta in the 7th century. With this he solved challenging problems like $61x^2+1=y^2$—over five centuries before Pierre de Fermat posed it as an open challenge in Europe.

=== Trigonometry ===
The Siddhānta Shiromani (written in 1150) demonstrates Bhaskara's knowledge of trigonometry, including the sine table and relationships between different trigonometric functions. He also developed spherical trigonometry, along with other interesting trigonometrical results. In particular Bhaskara seemed more interested in trigonometry for its own sake than his predecessors who saw it only as a tool for calculation. Among the many interesting results given by Bhaskara, results found in his works include computation of sines of angles of 18 and 36 degrees, and the now well known formulae for $\sin\left(a + b\right)$ and $\sin\left(a - b\right)$.

=== Calculus ===
Bhaskara devised a way of working with infinitesimals applied to trigonometry. There is evidence of an early form of Rolle's theorem in his work, though it was stated without a modern formal proof. In his astronomical work, Bhāskara gives a result that looks like a precursor to infinitesimal methods: if $x \approx y$ then $\sin(y) - \sin(x) \approx (y - x)\cos(y)$. This can be interpreted as the discovery that cosine is the derivative of sine,although he did not develop the notion of a derivative. In his works, there are traces of a special case of mean value theorem. The mean value formula for inverse interpolation of the sine was later formulated by Parameshvara in the 15th century in the Lilavati Bhasya, a commentary on Bhāskara’s Lilavati.

== Astronomy ==
Using an astronomical model developed by Brahmagupta in the 7th century, Bhāskara accurately defined many astronomical quantities, including, for example, the length of the sidereal year, the time that is required for the Sun to orbit the Earth, as approximately 365.2588 days which is the same as in Surya siddhanta. The modern accepted measurement is 365.25636 days, a difference of 3.5 minutes.

His mathematical astronomy text Siddhanta Shiromani is written in two parts: the first part on mathematical astronomy and the second part on the sphere.

The twelve chapters of the first part cover topics such as:

- Mean longitudes of the planets.
- True longitudes of the planets.
- The three problems of diurnal rotation. Diurnal motion refers to the apparent daily motion of stars around the Earth, or more precisely around the two celestial poles. It is caused by the Earth's rotation on its axis, so every star apparently moves on a circle that is called the diurnal circle.
- Syzygies.
- Lunar eclipses.
- Solar eclipses.
- Latitudes of the planets.
- Sunrise equation.
- The Moon's crescent.
- Conjunctions of the planets with each other.
- Conjunctions of the planets with the fixed stars.
- The paths of the Sun and Moon.

The second part contains thirteen chapters on the sphere. It covers topics such as:

- Praise of study of the sphere.
- Nature of the sphere.
- Cosmography and geography.
- Planetary mean motion.
- Eccentric epicyclic model of the planets.
- The armillary sphere.
- Spherical trigonometry.
- Ellipse calculations.
- First visibilities of the planets.
- Calculating the lunar crescent.
- Astronomical instruments.
- The seasons.
- Problems of astronomical calculations.

== Engineering ==
The earliest reference to a perpetual motion machine date back to 1150, when Bhāskara II described a wheel that he claimed would run forever.

Bhāskara II invented a variety of instruments one of which is Yaṣṭi-yantra. This device could vary from a simple stick to V-shaped staffs designed specifically for determining angles with the help of a calibrated scale.

== Legends ==
In his book Lilavati, he reasons: "In this quantity also which has zero as its divisor there is no change even when many quantities have entered into it or come out [of it], just as at the time of destruction and creation when throngs of creatures enter into and come out of [him, there is no change in] the infinite and unchanging [Vishnu]".

=== "Behold!" ===
It has been stated, by several authors, that Bhaskara II proved the Pythagorean theorem by drawing a diagram and providing the single word "Behold!". Sometimes Bhaskara's name is omitted and this is referred to as the Hindu proof, well known by schoolchildren.

However, Bhaskara II, in his Bijaganita, devotes two verses and prose commentaries following them on the explanation of the proofs.

A mathematics historian Kim Plofker comments:

These verses are presumably the ultimate source of the widespread legend ...

Exactly which part of these verses was meant by her is not clear. But the prose commentary after the latter verse ends as follows:

And otherwise, when one has set down those parts of the figure there [merely] seeing [it is sufficient].

== Legacy ==
A number of institutes and colleges in India are named after him, including Bhaskaracharya Pratishthana in Pune, Bhaskaracharya College of Applied Sciences in Delhi, Bhaskaracharya Institute For Space Applications and Geo-Informatics in Gandhinagar.

On 20 November 1981 the Indian Space Research Organisation (ISRO) launched the Bhaskara II satellite honouring the mathematician and astronomer.

Invis Multimedia released Bhaskaracharya, an Indian documentary short on the mathematician in 2015.

== See also ==
- List of Indian mathematicians
- Bride's Chair
- Bījapallava
