= Bhaskaracharya Institute For Space Applications and Geo-Informatics =

Gujarati government agency

Bhaskaracharya Institute For Space Applications and GeoInformatics
- Motto: We serve the Society
- Established: December 2003; 22 years ago
- Affiliations: Gujarat Technological University
- Location: Gandhinagar, Gujarat, India
- Website: bisag-n.gov.in

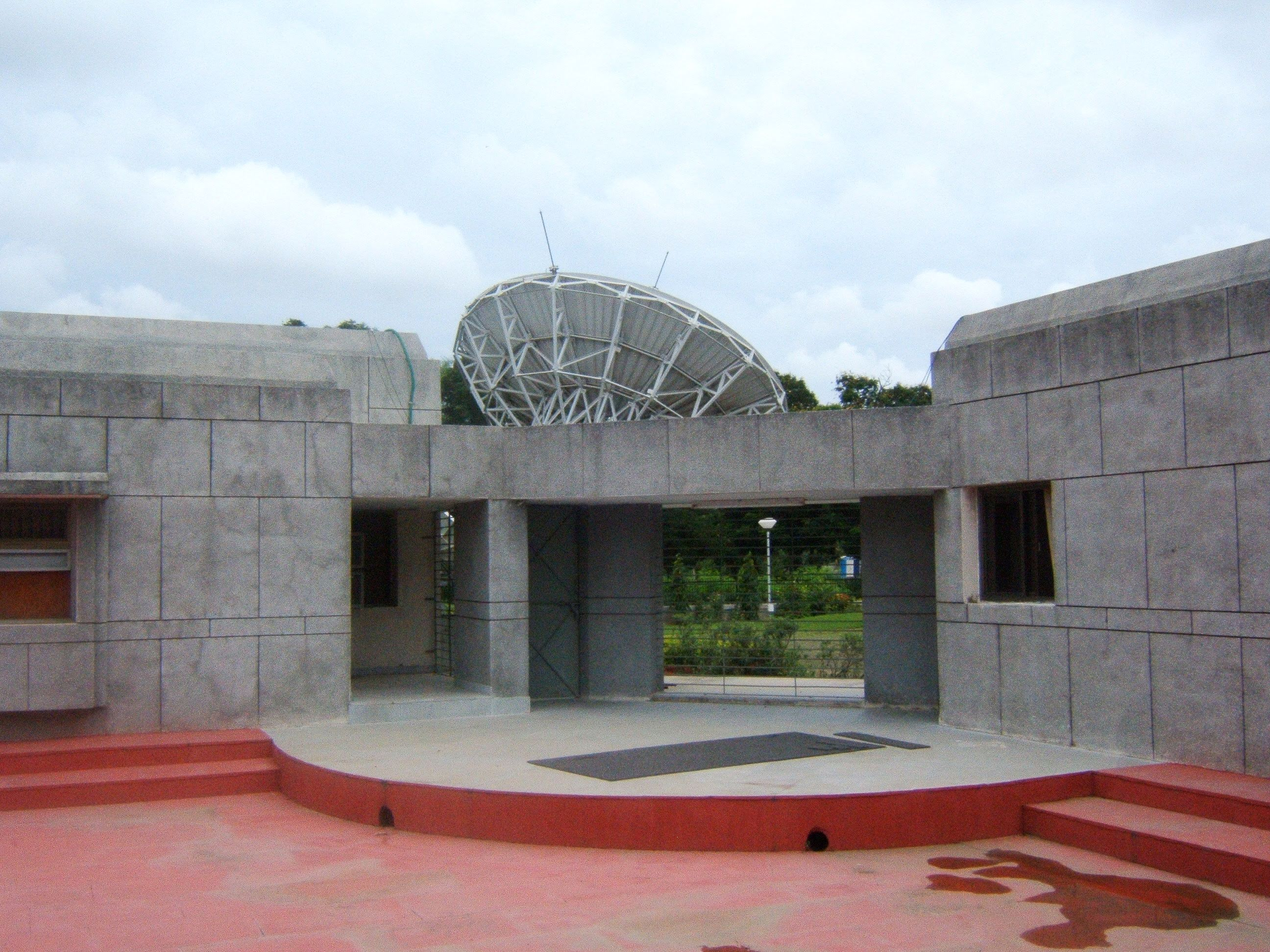
BISAG

Bhaskaracharya Institute for Space Applications and Geoinformatics (BISAG) is a Scientific Society under Ministry of Electronics & IT to facilitate to provide services and solutions in implementing map-based GeoSpatial Information Systems. BISAG's SATCOM network is a satellite communication network service to provide distant interaction statewide.

Currently BISAG is working to implement geo-spatial technologies for the planning and developmental activities pertaining to agriculture, land and water resource management, wasteland/watershed development, forestry, disaster management, infrastructure and education.

== History ==
In June 1997, realizing the need to have satellite based communication for training at state level the "Remote Sensing and Communication Centre" RESECO was established under Science and Technology Cell, of Education Department of Gujarat Government. RESECO was renamed to Bhaskaracharya Institute For Space Applications and Geo-Informatics after the great Indian Mathematician of the 12th century, Bhaskaracharya in December 2003.

== College to career program ==
The SATCOM facility comprises an uplink earth station, control room, TV studio, and a network of receiving classrooms. These network is used to air practical training for .net and java teaching sessions conducted by Microsoft and TCS respectively.

== Forestry ==
RESECO implemented India's first geographic information system (GIS) based computer system for the Forests & Environment Department of Gujarat. It is currently used as Coastal Zone Information System.

== Software and Academic Research ==
BISAG Scientists provide GIS and Geoinformatics based software and web applications to government of Gujarat. In academic research section there are many research papers published by BISAG scientists. The major research areas are as follows.

1. Networking
2. Big Data Mining
3. GIS & Geoinformatics
4. Machine Learning & Neural Networks
5. Image Processing
6. Information Security
7. Image enhancement and retrieval
8. Image Registration and satellite image processing
