= Bhāskara's wheel =

Hypothetical perpetual motion machine

Bhāskara's wheel was a hypothetical perpetual-motion machine design created around 1150 CE by the Indian mathematician Bhāskara II. The wheel consisted of curved or tilted spokes partially filled with mercury. Once in motion, the mercury would flow from one side of the spoke to another, thus forcing the wheel to continue motion, in constant dynamic equilibrium.

Like all perpetual-motion machines, Bhaskara's wheel is a long-discredited mechanism. To truly overbalance the wheel (so that torque in one direction is greater than the other) and cause motion, the radius of the spokes would have to be altered throughout the course of the wheel's motion. This would have to be done actively, thus consuming energy in the process — and so the machine would cease to be a perpetual-motion engine. It's also important to consider the wheel as it moves, as it can be placed into an overbalanced position so that the math makes it appear that there is an overall torque. It is perfectly possible for the wheel to exert a motion if it is placed off balance (much in the same way a pendulum will swing if moved out of a perfectly vertical position), but that motion does not continue indefinitely and will eventually be counteracted.
