= Dhule Airport =

Airport in Maharashtra, India

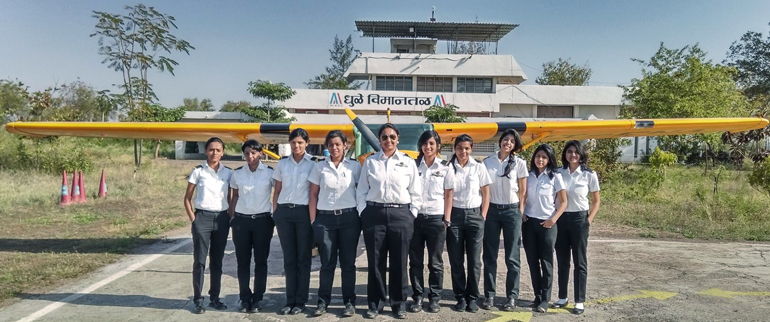
- IATA: DHL; ICAO: VA53

Summary
- Airport type: Public
- Owner: M.A.D.C.
- Operator: M.A.D.C.
- Serves: Dhule
- Location: Dhule, India
- Elevation AMSL: 920 ft (280 m)
- Coordinates: 20.925338°N 74.739467°E

Map
- Location within Maharashtra

Runways
Direction	Length		Surface
Direction	ft	m	Surface
09/27	4,400	1,341	Paved

Dhule Airport (IATA: DHL, ICAO: VA53) is located at Gondur area in Dhule, Maharashtra, India. This airstrip was constructed in 1974 by the Public Works Department and was transferred to the Maharashtra Airport Development Company (MADC) after its formation in 2002. The Bombay Flying Club leased the airstrip from the MADC and shifted its training operations here in 2009 to avoid the congested air-space of Mumbai.

A 150 m (490 ft) long taxiway connects the runway to a small terminal building and a hangar. Night landing facility is now available with runway lights and an ATC tower. Commercial operations will be starting soon in the coming future. Frequency in use 123.45 MHz
