= Kuṭṭākāra Śirōmaṇi =

Sanskrit mathematical text

The Kuṭṭākāra Śirōmaṇi is a medieval Indian treatise in Sanskrit devoted exclusively to the study of the Kuṭṭākāra, or Kuṭṭaka, an algorithm for solving linear Diophantine equations. It is authored by one Dēvarāja about whom little is known. From statements given by the author at the end of the book, one can infer that the name of Dēvarāja's father was Varadarājācārya, then famously known as Siddhāntavallabha. Since the book contains a few verses from the Lilavati, it should have been composed during a period after the Lilavati was composed, that is after 1150 CE.

Treatises such as the Kuṭṭākāra Śirōmaṇi devoted exclusively to specialized topics are very rare in Indian mathematical literature.

The algorithm was first formulated by Aryabhata I and given in verses in the Ganitapada of his Aryabhatiya. Aryabhata's description of the algorithm was brief and hence obscure and incomprehensible. However, from the interpretations of the verses by later Indian mathematicians we now have a fairly clear understanding of the original formulation of the algorithm. The Kuṭṭākāra Śirōmaṇi is one of the most comprehensive treatment of the algorithm. Devraja also wrote a self commentary, the Maha Laksami Muktavali on the Kuttakara Siromani to further explain the method.

The Kuṭṭākāra Śirōmaṇi is divided into three chapters, or Paricchedas. The first chapter of the book is on the Sāgra Kuṭṭākāra, the second chapter deals with the Niragra Kuṭṭākāra. This chapter also contains descriptions of the Samśliṣṭa Kuṭṭākāra. The third and the last chapter is on the Miśra-Śreṇi-Miśra-Kuṭṭākāra. The book also discusses the Vallikakuṭṭākāra and Sthitakuṭṭākāra. The methods are explained in detail with the help of illustrations and their important applications in Astronomy.

== See also ==
- Kuṭṭaka
