= Dhule =

- City
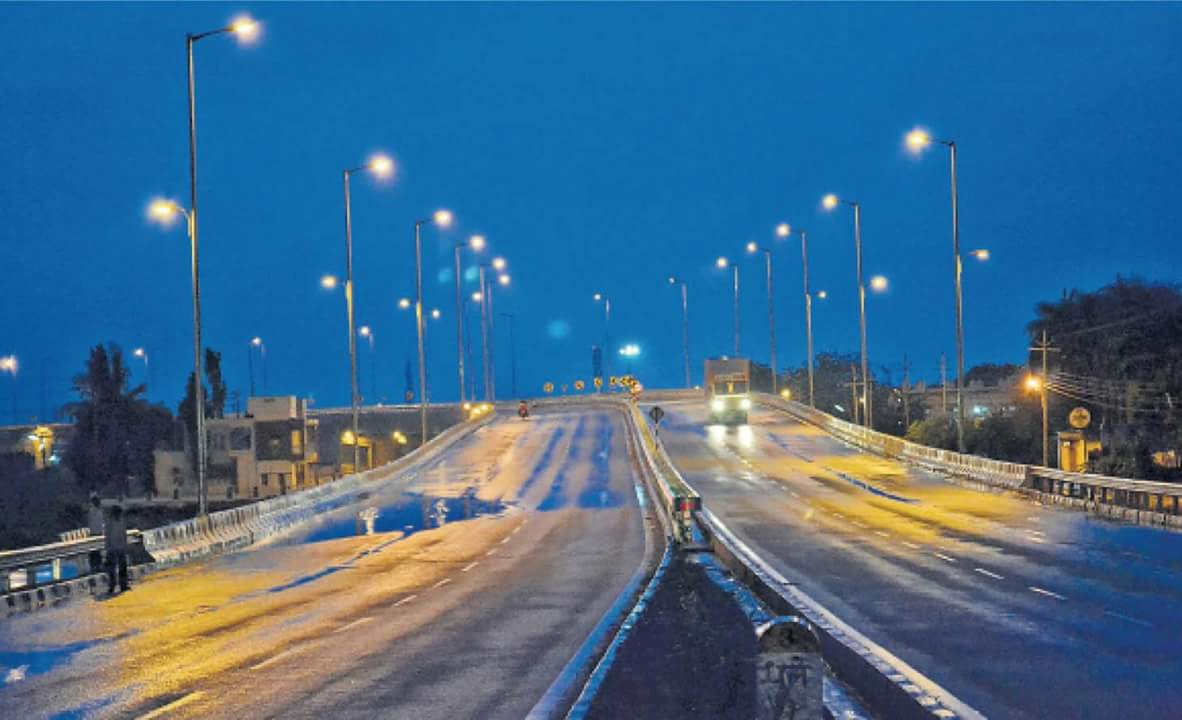
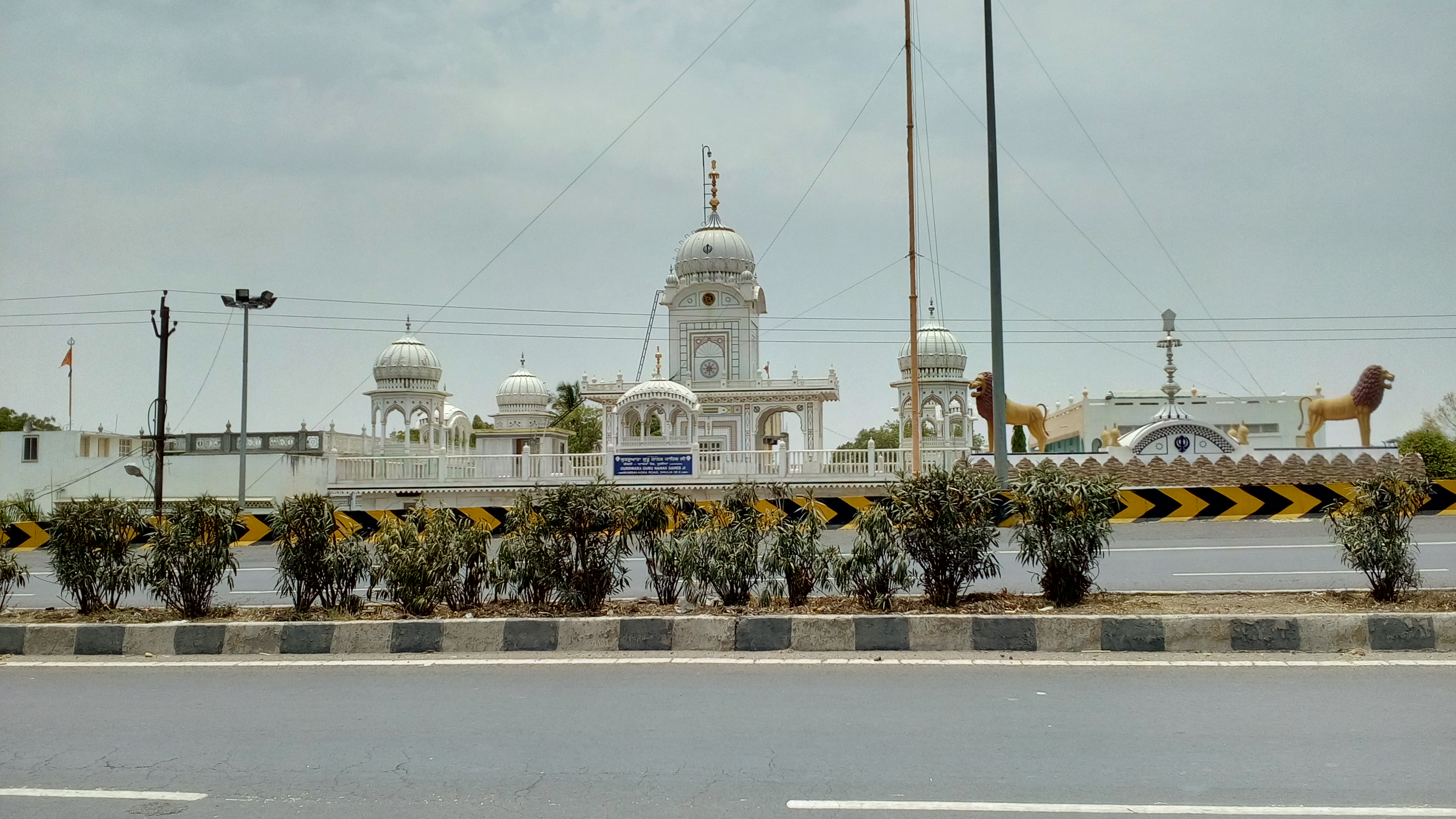
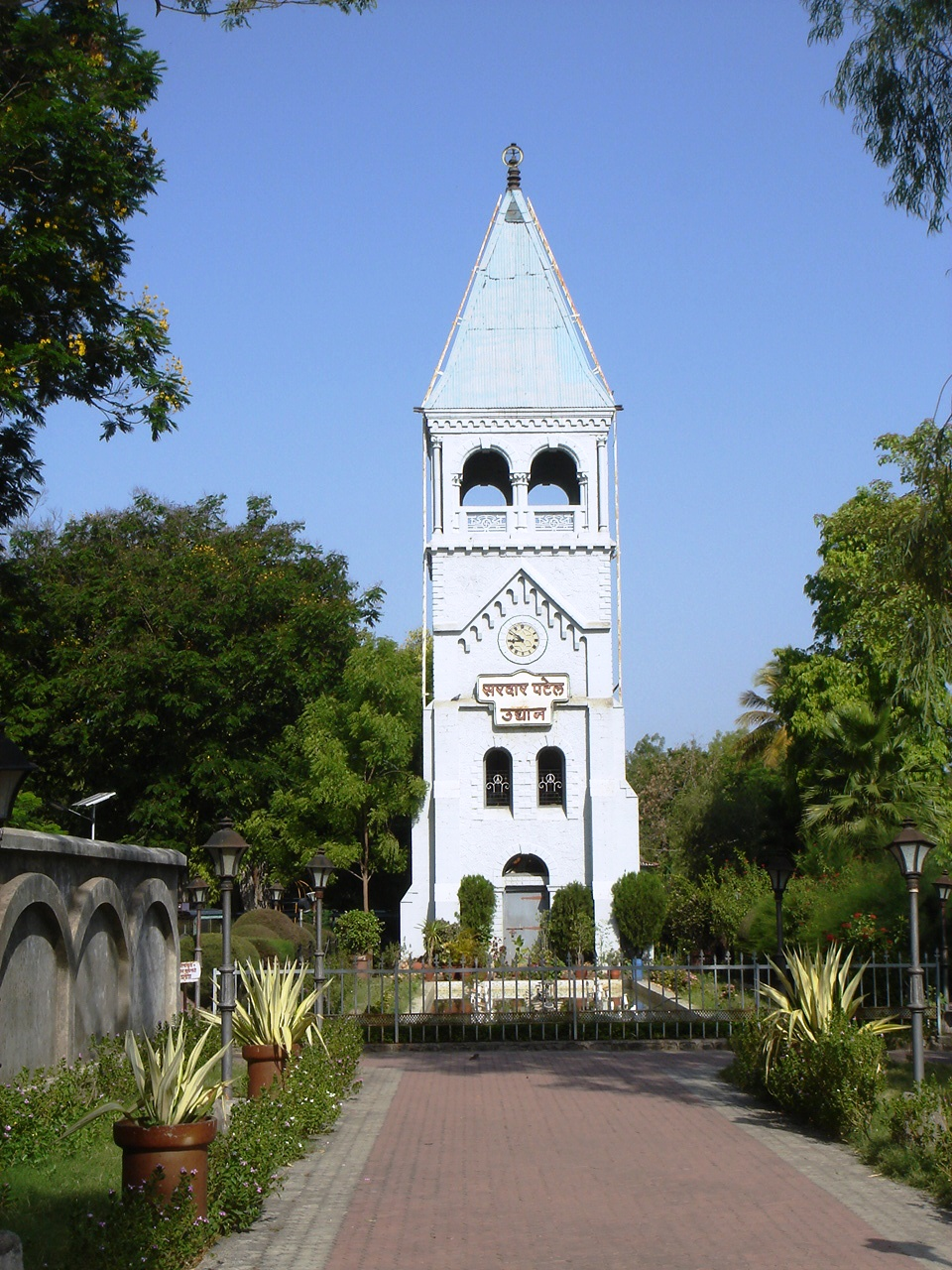
- Dhule Flyover, Gurudwara, Tower Garden

- Location of Dhule City in Maharashtra state
- Coordinates: 20°53′59″N 74°46′11″E
- Country: India
- State: Maharashtra
- Region: Khandesh (North Maharashtra)
- Division: Nashik
- District: Dhule district
- Tourist attractions: Drive in city
- Established: 30 June 2003
- Talukas: Dhule

Government
  - Type: Mayor–Council
  - District collector: Shri
  - Superintendent of Police: Shri
  - Municipal Commissioner: Shri
  - Mayor: Pratibhatai Chaudhari (BJP)

Area
  - City: 172 km^{2} (66 sq mi)

Dimensions
  - Length: 20.4 km (12.7 mi)
  - Width: 16.7 km (10.4 mi)
- Elevation: 319 m (1,047 ft)

Population
  - City: 855,603
  - Rank: India: 23rd
  - Metro: 575,603
- Demonym: Dhulekar

Languages
  - Official: Marathi
- Time zone: UTC+5:30 (IST)
- PIN: 42400x
- Telephone code: +91 2562
- ISO 3166 code: [[ISO 3166-2:IN|]]
- Vehicle registration: MH-18
- Sex ratio: 52/48 ♂/♀
- Climate: Aw (Köppen)
- Avg. summer temperature: 44 °C (111 °F)
- Avg. winter temperature: 20 °C (68 °F)
- Website: www.dhule.nic.in

Dhule is one of the largest cities in Maharashtra, and central region of India. The city located in the Dhule District in the northwestern part of Maharashtra state, known as West Khandesh. Situated on the banks of Panzara River, Dhule is the regional headquarters of MIDC, RTO, and MTDC.

The city, with industrial areas, schools, hospitals, and residential areas, has communications and transport infrastructures. Dhule is largely emerging as one of the upcoming hubs of textile, edible oil, Information Technology, and power-loom across the state and has gained a strategic advantage for being on the junction of three National Highways viz. NH-3, NH-6, and NH-211 and on most anticipated Manmad – Indore Rail Project. Recently Ministry of Surface Transport has granted conversion of surrounding 4 state highways to National Highway, after which Dhule would be the one amongst very few cities in India being located on convergence of 7 National Highways. Conversion of NH-3 from four lanes to six lanes between Dhule and Nashik with modern facilities is under process.

Dhule city is also a part of Delhi Mumbai Industrial Corridor Project, as Node – 17, India's most ambitious infrastructure program, aiming to develop new industrial cities and converging next generation technologies across infrastructure sectors.

As a part of creating employment across smaller cities, Ministry of Electronics and IT has also given in-principle approval for setting BPO at Dhule.

== History ==
Until the beginning of the 19th century, Dhule was an insignificant village, subordinate to Laling, the capital of the Laling or Fatehabad Subdivision. Under the rule of the Nizam, Laling was incorporated with the District of Daulatabad. The town passed successively through the hands of the Arab kings, the Mughals, and the Nizam, and into the power of the Peshwas about 1795. In 1803, it was completely deserted by its inhabitants on account of the ravages of Holkar and the terrible famine of that year. In the following year, Balaji Balwant, a dependant of the Vinchurkar, to whom the parganas of Laling and Songir had been granted by the Peshwa, repeopled the town and received from the Vinchurkar, in return for his services, a grant of inam land and other privileges. He was subsequently entrusted with the entire management of the territory of Songir and Laling, and fixed his headquarters at Dhule, where he continued to exercise authority till the occupation of the country by the British in 1818. Dhule was immediately chosen as the headquarters of the newly formed District of Khandesh by Captain John Briggs. In British Raj Britishers call it Dhulia.In January 1819, he obtained sanction for building public offices for the transaction of revenue and judicial business. Artificers were brought from distant places, and the buildings were erected at a total cost of £2700. Every encouragement was offered to traders and others to settle in the new town. Building sites were granted rent-free in perpetuity, and advances were made both to the old inhabitants and strangers to enable them to erect substantial houses. At this time, Captain Briggs described Dhule as a small town, surrounded by garden cultivation, and shut in between an irrigation channel and the river. The town was located on the southern bank of the Panzara River with an area of about one square mile. In 1819, the population numbered only 2509 persons, living in 401 houses. In 1863, there were 10,000 inhabitants; while by 1872 the number had further increased to 12,489, with 2620 houses. From the date of its occupation by the British, the progress of Dhule had been steady. Towards the end of the 19th century the town had already become a significant trading center due to the trade in cotton and linseed. Coarse cotton, woolen cloths and turbans were manufactured for local use around this time. In 1872, Dhule was visited by a severe flood, which did much damage to houses and property.

The Dhulia aka Dhule civil hospital was established in 1825 by the British government.

Dhule was a cantonment town, and in year 1881 had two hospitals, telegraph and post offices. In 1873–74 there were four Government schools, with 551 pupils. Historically, the town has been divided into New and Old Dhule. In the latter, the houses were irregularly built, the majority being of a very humble description.

== Geography ==
Dhule is located at 20.9°N 74.78°E. It has an average elevation of 250 metres (787 feet). Dhule lies in the Khandesh region, which forms the northwest corner of the Deccan Plateau. Dhule City is a part of khandesh region.

The Dhule district is bordered in the west by the Gujarat State and in the north by Madhya Pradesh along with Nandurbar district, and in the south and east by Nashik district and Jalgaon District respectively. It is situated in a valley of the Tapi River along the banks of the Panzara River.

Subdivisions in Dhule city

1. Devpur
2. Mahindale
3. Walwadi
4. Mohadi Upnagar
5. Nagavbari
6. Old Dhule
7. Chittod
8. Morane
9. Awadhan

=== Climate ===
Climate data for Dhule
Month	Jan	Feb	Mar	Apr	May	Jun	Jul	Aug	Sep	Oct	Nov	Dec	Year
Mean daily maximum °C (°F)	29 (84)	32 (90)	36 (97)	38 (100)	39 (102)	34 (93)	30 (86)	29 (84)	30 (86)	32 (90)	30 (86)	28 (82)	32 (90)
Mean daily minimum °C (°F)	12 (54)	14 (57)	19 (66)	22 (72)	25 (77)	24 (75)	22 (72)	21 (70)	21 (70)	19 (66)	15 (59)	12 (54)	19 (66)
Average precipitation mm (inches)	33.33 (1.31)	2.1 (0.08)	3.3 (0.13)	3.5 (0.14)	4.4 (0.17)	114.2 (4.50)	115.6 (4.55)	119.6 (4.71)	121.6 (4.79)	60.8 (2.39)	10.7 (0.42)	6.5 (0.26)	595.63 (23.45)
Source: Dhule Weather

The climate of the district is on the whole dry except during the south-west monsoon season. The year may be divided into four seasons. The cold season from December to February is followed by the hot season from March to May. The south-west monsoon season which follows thereafter, lasts till September. October and November constitute the post-monsoon season.

The average annual rainfall in the district is 674.0 mm. The rainfall is heavier in the hilly regions of the Western Ghats mountain range and the Satpura ranges. From about the latter half of February, temperatures increase steadily till May which is the hottest part of the year with the mean daily maximum temperature at 40.7 degrees Celsius.

From November, both day and night temperatures drop rapidly till January which is the coldest month with the mean daily minimum at 16.2-degree Celsius. Except during the south-west monsoon season when the humidity is above 70 per cent, the air is rather dry over the district during the rest of the year.

== Demographics ==
Religions in Dhule city (2011)
Religion	Percent
Hinduism	64.52%
Islam	31.58%
Jainism	1.60%
Buddhism	1.31%
Other or not stated	0.99%

As of 2011 India census, Dhule had a population of 375,603. At the 2011 census, males constitute 52% of the population and females 48%. Dhule has an average literacy rate of 85%, higher than the national average of 74%: male literacy is 80% and, female literacy is 69%. 13% of the population is under 6 years of age.

Languages in Dhule city (2011)
1. Marathi (54.0%)
2. Urdu (28.3%)
3. Hindi (6.01%)
4. Khandeshi (4.07%)
5. Marwari (2.07%)
6. Sindhi (1.56%)
7. Bhili (1.01%)
8. Gujarati (0.98%)
9. Others (1.94%)

At the time of the 2011 census, 54.04% of the population spoke Marathi, 28.32% Urdu, 6.01% Hindi, 4.07% Khandeshi, 2.07% Marwari, 1.56% Sindhi, 1.01% Bhili and 0.98% Gujarati as their first language.

== Education ==
=== Colleges ===
- S.S.V.P.S's Bapusaheb Shivajirao Deore College of Engineering
- SES College of Engineering
- SVKM's NMIMS Global University

=== Medical colleges ===
- Shri Bhausaheb Hire Government Medical College, Dhule

== Government Hospital ==
Shri Bhausaheb Hire Government Medical College was founded in 1989. Earlier hospital of Medical College was sub-merged with that of District Civil Hospital. However, since it was leading to several conflicts amongst staff of respective departments, Department of Medical Education decided to venture out itself from District Civil Hospital and erected its new building with state of the art medical facilities at Chakkar Bardi area of the city; around 8 km away from city alongside NH-6 with total capacity of 500 beds and have shifted with effect from 14 March 2016.

At the old site in city, New Civil Hospital with a total capacity of 200 to 250 beds is proposed. MSRTC has resumed city-bus service connecting Central Bus Stand to Chakkar Bardi, so as to avoid any inconvenience to public.

== Industries and Economy of the City ==
Dhule is well known for purest 'milk and ghee' production, maximum cultivable land and production of groundnut, foremost in agro-based industries, leader in wind power generation.

In the Sakri Taluka there is the one of Asia's Largest Solar projects near Chhadvel Korde village.

Also there is Asia's largest Wind Mills Project run by Suzlon Company near Chhadvel Korde and Nijampur villages.

Dondaicha in Shindkheda taluka is famous for the chilly market. There is also a Starch factory here. Many cottage industries are operational in the district. Beedi rolling, pottery, brick making, knitting saris on handlooms, oil extraction from ground nut and sesame are few of them. Wood cutting units are operated at Dhule, Shirpur and Pimpalner.

Being centrally located on about to complete Delhi Mumbai Industrial Corridor Project (DMIC), Safexpress has established India's largest Logistics Park in the outskirts of Dhule City on National Highway No. 6.

As part of the successful development of the region under DMIC, there is a need to focus on ensuring the requisite irrigation infrastructure for ensuring availability of water throughout the year.

Reasons for selecting Dhule- Nardana Investment Region (DNIR):

- Being located close to the intersection of NH-6, NH-3 and NH-211, this region enjoys advantage of excellent connectivity to ports and hinterland.
- With abundant supply of raw materials and human resources, this region has wide potential for setting up of manufacturing units for textile products.
- Dhule Airport is also located close to the proposed region.
- This region is served by the major river basin formed by Tapi River

Keep apart proposed DNIR, snapshot of existing Dhule M.I.D.C. is as under:

1) Dhule Industrial Area:

M.I.D.C. has planned to develop an industrial area on 400.35 Hect. of land. About 278.08 Hect. of land has come into possession of MIDC. MIDC has provided all the basic infrastructure such as roads, street lights, water supply pipe lines in this area.

MIDC has constructed an earthen dam on Motinala to fulfill the requirement of water of the industrial area. MIDC has provided water supply scheme of 4.50 MLD capacity. Presently the consumption of the water is about 2.20 MLD. The rate of allotment of the industrial plot is Rs. 100.00 per sqm. The Association namely "Dhule Avdhan Manufacturers Association Avadhan, Dhule" has been established for the development of Industries in MIDC Dhule Industrial Area.

The expansion of existing MIDC has been proposed vide Phase- II in Raver area, situated in outskirts of the city, which is having an area of more than 1600 acres (643 hectares) and currently this proposal is under consideration of State Government.

Planned Manmad-Dhule-Indore Railway line have also been considered in the original proposal of DMIC (Delhi-Mumbai Industrial Corridor Project), which will boost Industrial growth in and around city.

2) Nardana Central Government sponsored Growth Centre:

MIDC has planned to develop an industrial area on 750.09 Hect. of land. About 648.56 Hect. of land has come in possession of MIDC. The reservation of water for 4.38 MM3 per year has been granted by Irrigation Department. MIDC has provided the water supply scheme for this industrial area. This scheme includes Jackwell, 600 mm dia PSC raw water rising main (13.50 km.), 400 mm dia PSC pure water rising main (9.50 km.) water treatment plant of 6 MLD capacity & 1000 cum capacity ESR. Presently MIDC is developing phase I having land 480 Hect. MIDC has completed 7.22 km. WBM roads, out of which asphalting of 2.10 km road is completed. MIDC has also provided the water supply distribution pipelines. The rate of allotment of industrial plot is Rs. 50.00 per Sqm.

Under proposed DMIC, The Nardana Textile Park is being set up 30 km from Dhule City. The total area of the park will be approximately 648 hectares, on which 72 plots will be demarcated. The Dhule airstrip, just 30 km away from the industrial area, will provide accessibility to the park and facilitate a quick movement of material.

== Subdivisions in Dhule taluka ==
1. East Dhule city (old Dhule city area)
2. West Dhule City (Walwadi and Devpur area)
3. Central Dhule (municipality area)
4. South Dhule City (Mohadi area of city)
5. North Dhule City (Nagavbari area of city)
6. Songir (North Dhule Taluka)
7. Fagne (South-East Dhule Taluka)
8. kusumbe(West Dhule Taluka)
9. Kapadane (East Dhule Taluka)
10. Aarvi (South- West Dhule Taluka)

== Transportation ==
=== Rail ===
There are regular trains from Dhule to CSMT Mumbai. Dhule Terminus (Station Code: DHI) is also connected to Chalisgaon Junction Railway Station under Central Railways. The Chalisgaon Dhule Passenger runs between the two stations four times a day. As well as Dhule is important station on proposed railway line from Manmaad to Indore.

=== Road ===
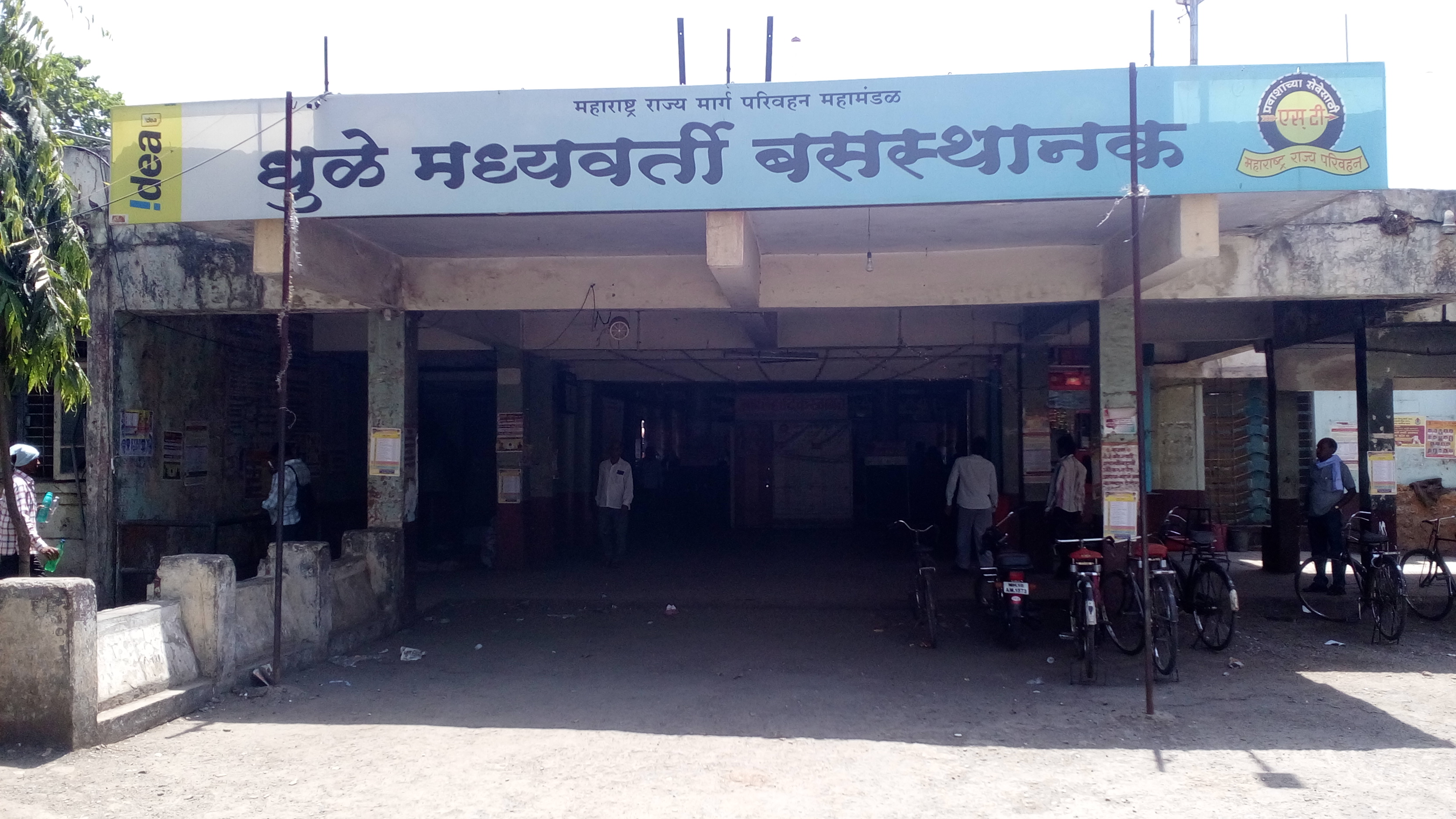
Dhule- Central Bus Stand

Dhule is one of the few cities in the Maharashtra State which is located on the junction of three National Highways, these being NH-3, NH-6 and NH-211. Through the Asian highway project, portions of NH3 and NH6 passing through Dhule have been converted into numbered Asian Highways AH47 & AH46 respectively.

Due to the heavy use of Central Bus Stand and traffic congestion within the city, one more bus stand has been built in Deopur, which became fully operational from 23 March 2015. From this stand, about 120 route buses are running on a daily basis. Central Bus Stand is connected to Deopur Bus Stand by four 25 seater mini-buses by Maharashtra State Road Transport Corporation (MSRTC). These buses run from Central Bus Stand to Nagav and from Deopur Bus Stand to Laling. Recognizing ongoing expansion of the city limits and the increased population, Shri Annasaheb Misal (IAS), The Collector & District Magistrate of Dhule and Shri Rajendra Deore (Dhule Depot Controller) of MSRTC started city-bus services in July 2016. This service is available on four different routes – Laling to Nagav, Fagne to Morane, Walwadi to Vadjai, and CBS to Chakkar Bardi.

=== Air ===
Dhule Airport (IATA: DHL, ICAO: VA53) is located at Gondur area in Dhule, Maharashtra, India. This airstrip was constructed in 1974 by the Public Works Department and was transferred to the Maharashtra Airport Development Company (MADC) after its formation in 2002.

=== Local Transport ===
MSRTC started city-bus services in July 2016. This service is available on four different routes – Laling to Nagav, Fagne to Morane, Walwadi to Vadjai, and CBS to Chakkar Bardi.

== Notable people ==
- Anup Agrawal – is an Indian politician and he is a Member of the Legislative Assembly, elected for the BJP from Dhule City in 2024.
- Anil Anna Gote – is an Indian politician and he was a Member of the Legislative Assembly, twice elected for the BJP from Dhule City.
- Subhash Bhamre – Ex. Union Minister of State (Defence), Renowned carcinologist
- Manoj Badale – Co-Owner of Rajasthan Royals, an Indian Premier League Team
- Sayali Sanjeev Chandsarkar – Marathi TV and film actress
- Yashvantrao Sakharam Desale – Freedom fighter and politician
- Pallavi Patil – Marathi film actress
- Lalit Prabhakar – Marathi film actor
- Smita Patil – Bollywood actress
- Vishwanath Kashinath Rajwade – Historian, scholar, writer, commentator, and, orator
- Jayakumar Jitendrasinh Rawal – Minister of Tourism and Employment Guarantee Scheme, Government of Maharashtra.
- Harish Salve – Former Solicitor General of India
- Ram V. Sutar – Sculptor Designer and Developer of Statue of Unity
- Mrunal Thakur – Bollywood Actress

== See also ==
- Dhule riots
