= Kuṭṭaka =

Mathematical algorithm

Kuṭṭaka is an algorithm for finding integer solutions of linear Diophantine equations. A linear Diophantine equation is an equation of the form ax + by = c where x and y are unknown quantities and a, b, and c are known quantities with integer values. The algorithm was originally invented by the Indian astronomer-mathematician Āryabhaṭa (476–550 CE) and is described very briefly in his Āryabhaṭīya. Āryabhaṭa did not give the algorithm the name Kuṭṭaka, and his description of the method was mostly obscure and incomprehensible. It was Bhāskara I (c. 600 – c. 680) who gave a detailed description of the algorithm with several examples from astronomy in his Āryabhatiyabhāṣya, who gave the algorithm the name Kuṭṭaka. In Sanskrit, the word Kuṭṭaka means pulverization (reducing to powder), and it indicates the nature of the algorithm. The algorithm in essence is a process where the coefficients in a given linear Diophantine equation are broken up into smaller numbers to get a linear Diophantine equation with smaller coefficients. In general, it is easy to find integer solutions of linear Diophantine equations with small coefficients. From a solution to the reduced equation, a solution to the original equation can be determined. Many Indian mathematicians after Aryabhaṭa have discussed the Kuṭṭaka method with variations and refinements. The Kuṭṭaka method was considered to be so important that the entire subject of algebra used to be called Kuṭṭaka-ganita or simply Kuṭṭaka. Sometimes the subject of solving linear Diophantine equations is also called Kuṭṭaka.

In literature, there are several other names for the Kuṭṭaka algorithm like Kuṭṭa, Kuṭṭakāra and Kuṭṭikāra. There is also a treatise devoted exclusively to a discussion of Kuṭṭaka. Such specialized treatises are very rare in the mathematical literature of ancient India. The treatise written in Sanskrit is titled Kuṭṭākāra Śirōmaṇi and is authored by one Devaraja.

The Kuṭṭaka algorithm has much similarity with and can be considered as a precursor of the modern day extended Euclidean algorithm. The latter algorithm is a procedure for finding integers x and y satisfying the condition ax + by = gcd(a, b).

== Aryabhaṭa's formulation of the problem ==
The problem that can supposedly be solved by the Kuṭṭaka method was not formulated by Aryabhaṭa as a problem of solving the linear Diophantine equation. Aryabhaṭa considered the following problems all of which are equivalent to the problem of solving the linear Diophantine equation:

- Find an integer which when divided by two given integers leaves two given remainders. This problem may be formulated in two different ways:

- Let the integer to be found be N, the divisors be a and b, and the remainders be R_{1} and R_{2}. Then the problem is to find N such that

N ≡ R_{1} (mod a) and N ≡ R_{2} (mod b).

- Letting the integer to be found to be N, the divisors be a and b, and the remainders be R_{1} and R_{2}, the problem is to find N such that there are integers x and y such that

N = ax + R_{1} and N = by + R_{2}.

This is equivalent to

ax − by = c where c = R_{2} − R_{1}.

- Find an integer such that its product with a given integer being increased or decreased by another given integer and then divided by a third integer leaves no remainder. Letting the integer to be determined be x and the three integers be a, b and c, the problem is to find x such that (ax ± b)/c is an integer y. This is equivalent to finding integers x and y such that

(ax ± b)/c = y.

This in turn is equivalent to the problem of finding integer solutions of ax ± by = ±c.

== Reduction of the problem ==
Aryabhata and other Indian writers had noted the following property of linear Diophantine equations: "The linear Diophantine equation ax + by = c has a solution if and only if gcd(a, b) is a divisor of c." So the first stage in the pulverization process is to cancel out the common factor gcd(a, b) from a, b and c, and obtain an equation with smaller coefficients in which the coefficients of x and y are relatively prime.

For example, Bhāskara I observes: "The dividend and the divisor shall become prime to each other, on being divided by the residue of their mutual division. The operation of the pulveriser should be considered in relation to them."

== Aryabhata's algorithm ==
Aryabhata gave the algorithm for solving the linear Diophantine equation in verses 32–33 of Ganitapada of Aryabhatiya. Taking Bhāskara I's explanation of these verses also into consideration, Bibhutibbhushan Datta has given the following translation of these verses:

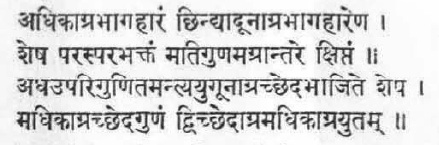
Description of Kuttaka as given by Aryabhata in Aryabhatiya

"Divide the divisor corresponding to the greater remainder by the divisor corresponding to the smaller remainder. The residue (and the divisor corresponding to the smaller remainder) being mutually divided (until the remainder becomes zero), the last quotient should be multiplied by an optional integer and then added (in case the number of quotients of the mutual division is even) or subtracted (in case the number of quotients is odd) by the difference of the remainders. (Place the other quotients of the mutual division successively one below the other in a column; below them the result just obtained and underneath it the optional integer.) Any number below (that is, the penultimate) is multiplied by the one just above it and added by that just below it. Divide the last number (obtained so doing repeatedly) by the divisor corresponding to the smaller remainder; then multiply the residue by the divisor corresponding to the greater remainder and add the greater remainder. (The result will be) the number corresponding to the two divisors."

Some comments are in order.

- The algorithm yields the smallest positive integer which gives specified remainders when divided by given numbers.
- The validity of the algorithm can be established by translating the process into modern mathematical notations.
- Subsequent Indian mathematicians including Brahmagupta (628 AD), Mahavira (850), Aryabhata II (950), Sripati (1039), Bhāskara II (1150) and Narayana (1350) have developed several variants of this algorithm and have also discussed several special cases of the algorithm.

== Elaboration of Aryabhatta's Kuttaka ==
Without loss of generality, let $ax-by=c$ be our Diophantine equation where a, b are positive integers and c is an integer. Divide both sides of the equation by $\gcd(a,b)$. If c is not divisible by $\gcd(a,b)$ then there are no integer solutions to this equation. After the division, we get the equation $a'x-b'y=c'$. The solution to this equation is the solution to $ax-by=c$. Without loss of generality, let us consider a > b.

Using Euclidean division, follow these recursive steps:

a′ = a_{1}b′ + r_{1}
b′ = a_{2}r_{1} + r_{2}
r_{1} = a_{3}r_{2} + r_{3}
...
r_{n−2} = a_{n}r_{n−1} + 1. Where r_{n} = 1.

Now, define quantities x_{n+2}, x_{n+1}, x_{n},... by backward induction as follows: If n is odd, take x_{n+2} = 0 and x_{n+1} = 1. If n is even, take x_{n+2}=1 and x_{n+1}=r_{n−1}−1. Now, calculate all x_{m} (n≥m≥1) by x_{m}=a_{m}x_{m+1}+x_{m+2}. Then y = c′x_{1} and x = c′x_{2}.

== Example ==
=== Problem statement ===
Consider the following problem:

"Find an integer such that it leaves a remainder of 15 when divided by 29 and a remainder of 19 when divided by 45."

=== Data ===
     Remainders                                  = 15, 19
     Greater remainder                           = 19
     Divisor corresponding to greater remainder  = 45
     Smaller remainder                           = 15
     Divisor corresponding to smaller remainder  = 29
     Difference of remainders                    = 19 - 15 = 4

=== Step 1: Mutual divisions ===
    Divide 45 by 29 to get quotient 1 and remainder 16: 29 ) 45 ( 1                       
                                                             29
                                                            ----
    Divide 29 by 16 to get quotient 1 and remainder 13:      16 ) 29 ( 1                  
                                                                  16
                                                                 ----
    Divide 16 by 13 to get quotient 1 and remainder  3:           13 ) 16 ( 1             
                                                                       13
                                                                      ----
    Divide 13 by  3 to get quotient 4 and remainder  1:                 3 ) 13 ( 4        
                                                                            3
                                                                           ----
    Divide  3 by  1 to get quotient 3 and remainder  0:                      1 )  3 ( 3   
                                                                                  1
                                                                                ----
    The process of mutual division stops here.                                    0

=== Step 2: Choosing an optional integer ===
     Quotients                                         = 1, 1, 1, 4, 3
     Number of quotients                               = 4              (an even integer)
     (excluding the first quotient)
     Choose an optional integer                        = 2              (= k)
     The last quotient                                 = 3
     Multiply the optional integer by last quotient    = 2 × 3 =  6
     Add the above product to difference of remainders = 6 + 4 = 10     (= 3 × k + 4)

=== Step 4: Computation of successive numbers ===
Write elements of 1st column    :   1,  1,  4,  3, 2, 4 (contains 4 quotients)
Compute elements of 2nd column  :   1,  1,  4, 10, 2    (contains 3 quotients)
Compute elements of 3rd column  :   1,  1, 42, 10       (contains 2 quotients)
Compute elements of 4th column  :   1, 52, 42           (contains 1 quotient)
Compute elements of 5th column  :  94, 52               (contains no quotients)

The computational procedure is shown below:

Quotient 1   : 1                    1                      1                     1                      94  
                                                                                                      ↗
Quotient 2   : 1                    1                      1                    52  (52×1 + 42 =  94)   52 
                                                                              ↗ 
Quotient 3   : 4                    4                     42  (42×1 + 10 =52)   42
                                                        ↗ 
Quotient 4   : 3                   10   (10×4 + 2 = 42)   10 
                                 ↗
         k   : 2  (2×3 + 4 = 10)    2

Difference   : 4
of remainders

=== Step 5: Computation of solution ===
     The last number obtained                                                           = 94
     The residue when 94 is divided by the divisor corresponding to smaller remainder   = 7 
     Multiply this residue by the divisor corresponding to larger remainder             = 7 × 45 = 315
     Add the larger remainder                                                           = 315 + 19 = 334

=== Solution ===
The required number is 334.

=== Verification of solution ===
     334 = 11 × 29 + 15. So, 334 leaves a remainder of 15 when divided by 29.
     334 =  7 × 45 + 19. So, 334 leaves a remainder of 19 when divided by 45.

=== Remarks ===
The number 334 is the smallest integer which leaves remainders 15 and 19 when divided by 29 and 45 respectively.

== An example from Laghubhāskarīya ==
The following example taken from Laghubhāskarīya of Bhāskara I illustrates how the Kuttaka algorithm was used in the astronomical calculations in India.

=== Problem statement ===
The sum, the difference and the product increased by unity, of the residues of the revolutions of Saturn and Mars – each is a perfect square. Taking the equations furnished by the above and applying the methods of such quadratics obtain the (simplest) solution by the substitution of 2, 3, etc. successively (in the general solution). Then calculate the ahargana and the revolutions performed by Saturn and Mars in that time together with the number of solar years elapsed.

=== Some background information ===
In the Indian astronomical tradition, a Yuga is a period consisting of 1,577,917,500 civil days. Saturn makes 146,564 revolutions and Mars makes 229,6824 revolutions in a Yuga. So Saturn makes 146,564/1,577,917,500 = 36,641/394,479,375 revolutions in a day. By saying that the residue of the revolution of Saturn is x, what is meant is that the fractional number of revolutions is x/394,479,375. Similarly, Mars makes 229,6824/1,577,917,500 = 190,412/131,493,125 revolutions in a day. By saying that the residue of the revolution of Mars is y, what is meant is that the fractional number of revolutions is y/131,493,125.

=== Computation of the residues ===
Let x and y denote the residues of the revolutions of Saturn and Mars respectively satisfying the conditions stated in the problem. They must be such that each of x + y. x − y and xy + 1 is a perfect square.

Setting

x + y = 4p^{2}, x − y = 4q^{2}

one obtains

x = 2(p^{2} + q^{2}), y = 2(p^{2} − q^{2})

and so

xy + 1 = (2p^{2} − 1)^{2} + 4(p^{2} − q^{4}).

For xy + 1 also to be a perfect square we must have

p^{2} − q^{4} = 0, that is p^{2} = q^{4}.

Thus the following general solution is obtained:

x = 2(q^{4} + q^{2}), y = 2(q^{4} − q^{2}).

The value q = 2 yields the special solution x = 40, y = 24.

=== Computations of the aharganas and the numbers of revolutions ===
Ahargana is the number of days elapsed since the beginning of the Yuga.

==== Saturn ====
Let u be the value of the ahargana corresponding the residue 24 for Saturn. During u days, saturn would have completed (36,641/394,479,375)×u number of revolutions. Since there is a residue of 24, this number would include the fractional number 24/394,479,375 of revolutions also. Hence during the ahargana u, the number of revolutions completed would be

(36,641 / 394,479,375) × u − 24/394,479,375 = (36,641 × u − 24) / 394,479,375

which would be an integer. Denoting this integer by v, the problem reduces to solving the following linear Diophantine equation:

(36,641 × u − 24) / 394,479,375 = v.

Kuttaka may be applied to solve this equation. The smallest solution is

u = 346,688,814 and v = 32,202.

==== Mars ====
Let u be the value of the ahargana corresponding the residue 40 for Mars. During u days, Mars would have completed (190,412/131,493,125) × u number of revolutions. Since there is a residue of 40, this number would include the fractional number 40/131,493,125 of revolutions also. Hence during the ahargana u, the number of revolutions completed would be

(190,412 / 131,493,125) × u − 40 / 131,493,125 = (190,412 × u − 40) / 131,493,125

which would be an integer. Denoting this integer by v, the problem reduces to solving the following linear Diophantine equation:

(190,412 × u − 40) / 131,493,125 = v.

Kuttaka may be applied to solve this equation. The smallest solution is

u = 118,076,020 and v = 171,872.
