= Dhule riots =

The Dhule riots were riots between the Hindu and Muslim community that took place in December 1992, October 2008 and January 2013 in Dhule in northern Maharashtra, India. These riots led to death of more than 18 people in the rioting as well as police firing. Hundreds of civilians and police were injured.

== 9 December 1992. ==
After Babari Masjid demolition on 6 December 1992, Riots triggered in Dhule city in Lala Sardar Nagar. A mob of around 1000 Muslims gathered and attacked Hindu families in Lala Sardar Nagar. Muslims demolished few houses and burnt few homes. Few were injured from both sides. It's a Muslim populated area and as only few Hindu families were residing in this area, Hindus suffered more and they had to leave the area. Hindu poor families had to leave the area with heart filled with emotions.

== Dhule Riots 2008 ==
The communal riots erupted on 5 October 2008 when Muslims gathered to welcome a local Congress leader returning from the Hajj hurled stones at (or tore) posters posted by Hindu Rakhshak Sabha, a Hindutva outfit, which depicted bombings allegedly perpetrated by Muslim terrorists. Police did not intercede to stop the violence until the third day, according to reports. 11 people died and 383 were injured in the 2008 riots and 1,157 homes damaged. City was under curfew for at least four days after the riots.

== Dhule Police Firing 2013 ==
There were riots again in January 2013, which led to death of 7 people and injured over 200 people including 11 police officers, 102 policemen and 100 civilians. According to the police the riot started as the result of a row over an unpaid restaurant bill. Special Inspector General at the time, Deven Bharti, confirmed after the incidents that the multiple clashes left injured 175 people and seven people died in the Macchi Bazaar area (Fish Market Square) by the police firing. The riots spread in the Machhibazar, Palabazar and Madhapura areas of Dhule city. Two platoons of the riot control police were dispatched along with a larger police force to maintain a curfew.

Prior to the riots, Dhule city held Municipal elections in October 2012. Campaign speeches made by Muslim politicians, including Abu Azmi, were believed to be behind the riots and were probed by police for "content and context".

Then Maharashtra Chief Minister Prithviraj Chavan ordered a probe into the violence. A judicial commission, headed by retired Bombay High Court Judge Chandiwal, probed the case and a report was submitted to the state government in 2016, but was not made public.
