= Shirud =

Village in Maharashtra

- Village
- Location in Maharashtra, India Shirud (India)
- Coordinates: 20.7337°N 74.8916°E
- Country: India
- State: Maharashtra
- District: Dhule

Government
  - Type: Gram Panchayat

Area
  - Total: 38.943 km^{2} (15.036 sq mi)

Population (2011)
  - Total: 8,455
  - Density: 217.1/km^{2} (562.3/sq mi)

Language
  - Official: Marathi

Language Spoken
  - Regional: Khandeshi (Ahirani)
- Time zone: UTC+5:30 (IST)
- PIN: 424308
- Vehicle registration: MH-18

Shirud is a village in the Dhule district of Maharashtra, India, with a population of 8,455 as of the 2011 Census. Known for its historical and cultural landmarks, the village is home to the Kalika Devi Temple, a Hindu shrine dedicated to Goddess Kali. Constructed around 1200 CE and later renovated during the Maratha Empire (17th–19th century), the temple is recognized as a protected archaeological site for its ancient architecture and serene natural surroundings. Pilgrims flock to the temple during Navratri, a nine-day festival honoring the goddess, and an annual Khandoba Jatra fair in February attracts visitors for religious observances and local shopping over ten days.

Situated at the confluence of the Bori and Mandur rivers, Shirud features a small dam that supports local water resources. The village lies near the Shirud-Vinchur Chowfuli, a key road junction connecting it to neighboring regions. As a commercial and educational hub, Shirud hosts a weekly Friday bazaar where agricultural goods and handicrafts are traded, and its schools serve students from surrounding villages.

The village’s 2011 census data reflects a gender distribution of 51% males and 49% females, with a literacy rate of 76%. Road connectivity via state highways links Shirud to Dhule, the nearest major city approximately 25 kilometers away.
