= Anup Agrawal =

American financial economist

- Education: University of Pittsburgh (PhD)
- Occupation: Professor of Finance
- Employer: University of Alabama
- Title: Powell Chair of Finance
- Awards: Burnum Distinguished Professor Award (2021)

Anup Agrawal is a professor of Finance and Powell Chair of Finance at the University of Alabama. He is known for his research in corporate finance and investments, including corporate governance, mergers and acquisitions, executive compensation, corporate innovation, corporate fraud, insider trading, security analysts, and market efficiency.

== Research ==
Agrawal has published numerous papers in the top journals in Finance, Accounting, and Law and Economics, including the Journal of Finance, the Journal of Financial Economics, the Journal of Accounting & Economics, the Journal of Law & Economics, the Journal of Business, the Journal of Financial & Quantitative Analysis. His research has received over 20,000 citations in academic papers according to Google Scholar. Agrawal is considered one of the most prolific authors in finance.

== Editorial and academic boards ==
Agrawal has served on the editorial boards of several academic journals, including the Journal of Corporate Finance, International Review of Finance, Journal of Financial Research, Journal of Risk and Financial Management, Review of Financial Economics, North American Journal of Economics and Finance, Finance India, Journal of Small Business Management, and International Review of Business & Finance.

He has also served as the academic director of the Financial Management Association and as a track chair at several of their annual meetings and the Eastern Finance Association.

== Awards and honors ==
In 2021, Agrawal received the Burnum Distinguished Professor Award at the University of Alabama.

== Selected publications ==
- Agrawal, A., & Knoeber, C. R. (1996). Firm performance and mechanisms to control agency problems between managers and shareholders. Journal of Financial and Quantitative Analysis, 31(3), 377–397.
- Agrawal, A., & Chadha, S. (2005). Corporate governance and accounting scandals. Journal of Law and Economics, 48(2), 371–406.
- Agrawal, A., Jaffe, J. F., & Mandelker, G. N. (1992). The post-merger performance of acquiring firms: A reexamination of an anomaly. Journal of Finance, 47(4), 1605–1621.
- Agrawal, A., & Knoeber, C. R. (1996). Do some outside directors play a political role? Journal of Law and Economics, 44(1), 179–198.
- Agrawal, A., & Mandelker, G. N. (1987). Managerial incentives and corporate investment and financing decisions. Journal of Finance, 42(4), 823–837.
- Agrawal, A., & Mandelker, G. N. (1990). Large shareholders and the monitoring of managers: The case of antitakeover charter amendments. Journal of Financial and Quantitative Analysis, 25(2), 143–161.
- Agrawal, A., & Tandon, K. (1994). Anomalies or illusions? Evidence from stock markets in eighteen countries. Journal of International Money and finance, 13(1), 83–106.
- Agrawal, A., & Jaffe, J. F. (1999). The post-merger performance puzzle. In C. Cooper & A. Gregory (Eds.), Advances in Mergers and Acquisitions 1 (pp. 7–41). Emerald Group Publishing Limited.
- Agrawal, A., & Nagarajan, N. J. (1990). Corporate capital structure, agency costs, and ownership control: The case of all-equity firms. The Journal of Finance, 45(4), 1325–1331.
- Agrawal, A., Jaffe, J. F., & Karpoff, J. M. (2002). Management turnover and governance changes following the revelation of fraud. Journal of Law and Economics, 42(1), 23–56.
- Agrawal, A., & Walkling, R. A. (1994). Executive careers and compensation surrounding takeover bids. The Journal of Finance, 49(3), 985–1014.
- Agrawal, A., & Jayaraman, N. (1994). The dividend policies of all-equity firms: A direct test of the free cash flow theory. Managerial and Decision Economics, 15(2), 139–148.
- Agrawal, A., Chadha, S., & Chen, M. A. (2006). Who is afraid of Reg FD? The behavior and performance of sell-side analysts following the SEC's fair disclosure rules. Journal of Business, 79(6), 2811–2834.
