= Chalisgaon Junction railway station =

Railway Station in Maharashtra, India

Chalisgaon Junction चाळीसगाव जंक्शन
- Indian Railways logo

General information
- Location: Chalisgaon, Maharashtra, Pincode 424101; Maharashtra India
- Coordinates: 20°27′50″N 74°59′57″E
- Elevation: 351 metres (1,152 ft)
- System: Junction station
- Owner: Indian Railways
- Operator: Central Railway
- Lines: Chalisgaon–Dhule line Howrah–Nagpur–Mumbai line
- Platforms: 4
- Tracks: 4

Construction
- Structure type: At ground
- Parking: Available

Other information
- Station code: CSN
- Zone(s): Central Railway
- Division(s): Bhusawal

History
- Opened: 1860
- Electrified: 1968–69
- Former names: Great Indian Peninsula Railway
Location
- Location within Maharashtra

Chalisgaon Junction Railway Station is a Railway Junction in Chalisgaon in Jalgaon district in the Indian state of Maharashtra. It is one of the oldest Railway stations of India opened in 1863 on the Kalyan-Bhusawal Railway line of Central Railway. A Branch line from here connects to the Dhule city which Makes Chalisgaon Railway Station a Railway Junction.

It is well-connected to different parts of the state and the country by the rail network. It has four platforms and is served by a total of 29 Mail/Express trains, 10 MEMU trains, 18 Superfast trains and 3 HumSafar Trains. This makes it one of the important junctions in the Indian Railways network in Maharashtra, providing convenient and efficient rail connectivity to the people.

== Electrification ==
Railways in the Chalisgaon area were electrified in 1968–69.

== Amenities ==
Amenities at Chalisgaon railway station include A computerized reservation office, waiting room, retiring room, and bookstall.

== Gallery ==
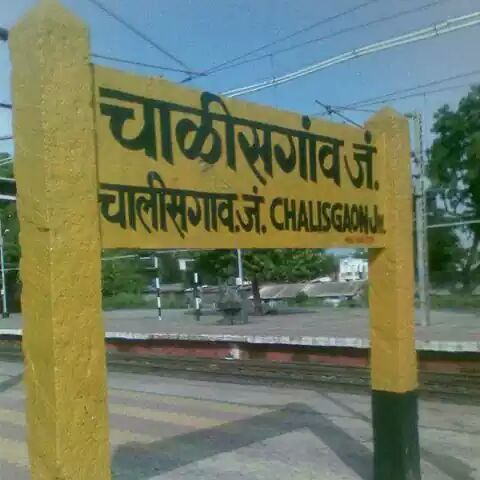
Chalisgaon Railway Station
