= Dhule railway station =

Railway Station in Maharashtra, India

Dhule धुळे
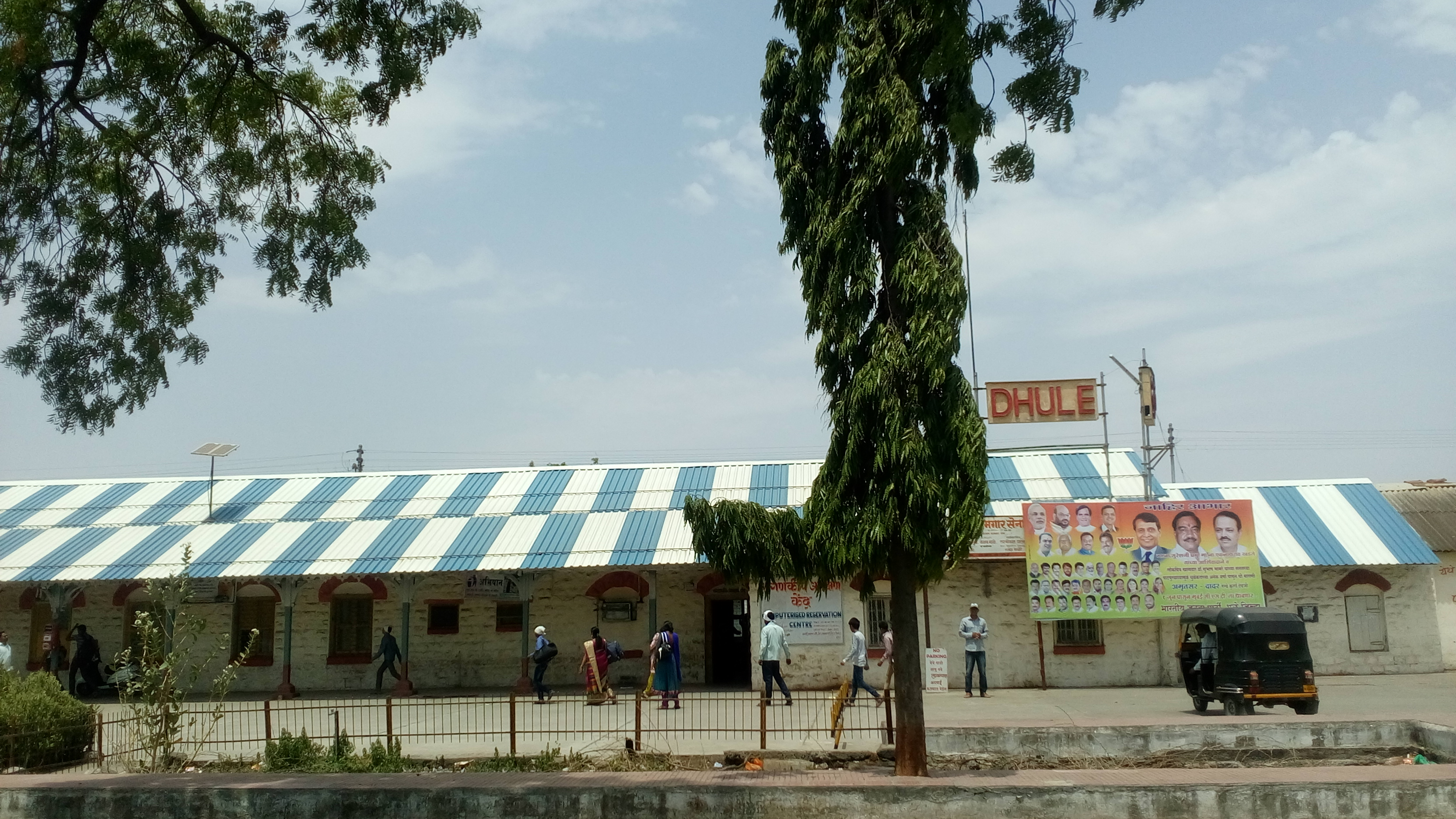
- Dhule Terminus

General information
- Location: Dhule, Maharashtra, Pincode 424001; Maharashtra India
- Coordinates: 20°53′16″N 74°46′05″E
- Elevation: 274 metres (899 ft)
- System: Regional rail
- Owner: Indian Railways
- Operator: Central Railway
- Line: Chalisgaon–Dhule line
- Platforms: 2
- Tracks: 1

Construction
- Structure type: At-grade
- Parking: Available
- Accessible: Disabled access

Other information
- Status: Functioning
- Station code: DHI
- Zone(s): Central Railway
- Division(s): Bhusawal

History
- Opened: 1900; 126 years ago
- Former names: Great Indian Peninsula Railway
Location
- Location within Maharashtra

Dhule railway station serves Dhule in Dhule district in the Indian state of Maharashtra. Dhule city has a railway terminus, which is connected to central railway line via Chalisgaon. A passenger train runs between the two stations four times a day. As well as Dhule to CSMT daily express trains runs daily. Dhule is connected with Pune and Nanded with connected track from Chalisgaon and Manmaad. New Dhule railway station is proposed new railway station on the line Manmaad-Indore Railway line.

== History ==
The Chalisgaon–Dhulia branch line emanates from the Bombay–Bhusawal route at Chalisgaon, and runs in the northern direction to enter Dhule district wherein it terminates at Dhule.

This line was opened for traffic in 1900. It is a broad-gauge (5 ft 6in) single line and has about 17 miles length in the district. Jamda and Rajmane, respectively 9 and 15 miles away from Chalisgaon are the only two stations in the district on this route.

Railways in the Chalisgaon to Dhule area are now electrified.
