= Siddhānta Shiromani =

Book by Bhaskara II

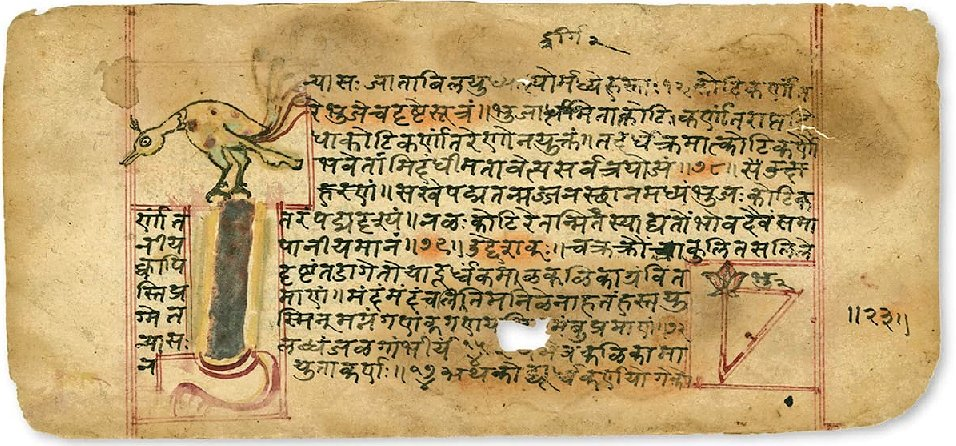
Page from Lilavati, the first volume of Siddhānta Śiromaṇī. Use of the Pythagorean theorem in the corner. 1650 edition

Siddhānta Śiromaṇi (Sanskrit: सिद्धान्त शिरोमणि, "Crown of treatises") is the major treatise of Indian mathematician Bhāskara II. He wrote the Siddhānta Śiromaṇi in 1150 when he was 36 years old. The work is composed in Sanskrit Language in 1450 verses.

== Parts ==
=== Līlāvatī ===
The name of the book comes from his daughter, Līlāvatī. It is the first volume of the Siddhānta Śiromaṇi. The book contains thirteen chapters, 278 verses, mainly arithmetic and measurement.

=== Beejagaṇita ===
It is the second volume of Siddhānta Śiromaṇi. It is divided into six parts, contains 213 verses and is devoted to algebra.

=== Gaṇitādhyāya and Golādhyāya ===
Gaṇitādhyāya and Golādhyāya of Siddhānta Śiromaṇi are devoted to astronomy. All put together there are about 900 verses. (Gaṇitādhyāya has 451 and Golādhyāya has 501 verses).

== Translations ==
In 1797, Safdar Ali Khan of Hyderabad translated the Siddhanta Shiromani into Persian as Zij-i Sarumani. The translation is now a lost work, and is known only from a mention in Khan's other work - Zij-i Safdari.
