= Cela, Angola =

Cela
- Municipality
- Location in Angola
- Coordinates: 11°21′30″S 15°07′10″E
- Country: Angola
- Province: Cuanza Sul

Area
  - Total: 4,610 km^{2} (1,780 sq mi)

Population (2014 Census)
  - Total: 225,520
  - Density: 56/km^{2} (150/sq mi)
- Time zone: UTC+1 (WAT)
- Climate: Cwb

Cela is a município (municipality) in the province of Cuanza Sul (Kwanza Sul) in Angola. It covers an area of 4,610 square kilometres (1,780 sq mi) and its population is 225,520 in 2014.

Cela is bordered to the north by the municipality of Quibala, to the east by the municipality of Andulo, to the south by the municipalities of Bailundo and Cassongue, and to the west by the municipalities of Seles and Ebo.

The municipality contains the comunas (communes) of Waku Kungo, Kissanga Kungo and Sanga. The municipal seat is Waku Kungo.
