= Atome =

Atome may refer to:

- Atomè, Benin
- Atôme, Angola
- The Atome, a two-piece swimsuit invented in 1932 by Jacques Heim

== See also ==
- Atoma (disambiguation)
- Tafi Atome Monkey Sanctuary, Ghana
