= List of Indian astronomical treatises =

Indian Astronomical Treatises

Ancient India was one of the most important seat of Astronomical studies. There were many scholars, philosophers and astronomers in ancient India, who wrote treatises on experimental and mathematical astronomy. Most of the Ancient Indian Astronomical Treatises were written and composed in Sanskrit language.

== List of the Astronomical Treatises ==
1. Vedanga Jyotisha
2. Aryabhatiya
3. Brahmasphuta-siddhanta
4. Pañcasiddhāntikā
5. Mahabhaskariya
6. Laghubhaskariya
7. Aryabhatiyabhashya
8. Śisyadhīvrddhida
9. Siddhāntatilaka
10. Siddhāntaśiromani
11. Karanakutūhala
12. Siddhāntaśekhara
13. Yantra-rāja
14. Jyotirmimamsa
15. Sphutanirnaya
16. Karanottama
17. Uparāgakriyākrama
18. Śiṣyadhīvṛddhidatantra
19. Brihat-Samhita
20. Grahana-Maala
21. Siddhaanta Sudhaa
22. Lilavati
23. Shatapatha Brahmana
24. Surya Siddhanta
25. Makarandasarini
26. Mahadevi (astronomy book)
27. Rājamṛgāṅka (astronomy book)
28. Jagadbhūṣaṇa
29. Grahacaranibandhana and lost text Mahamarganibandhana
30. Tantrasamgraha
31. Karanapaddhati
32. Venvaroha
