= Sangam =

Sangam or Sangama (the Sanskrit word for confluence) may refer to:

== Confluence of rivers ==
- Sangam, any confluence of two or more rivers in Indian languages
- Triveni Sangam, the confluence of three rivers at Prayagraj: the Ganges, Yamuna and the mythical Saraswati
- Sangama or Mekedaatu, confluence of Arkawathy and Cauvery rivers in Karnataka, India

== History ==
- Legendary Tamil Sangams, legendary assemblies of Tamil scholars and poets in the remote past
  - First Sangam
  - Second Sangam
  - Third Sangam
  - Sangam literature, a collection of Tamil literature and the earliest period of South Indian history, when the Tamil Sangams were held
- Sangama dynasty, the first dynasty of the Vijayanagara Empire (c. 1336–1485)

== Places ==
- Sangam, Akhnoor, a village in Jammu and Kashmir
- Sangam, Anantnag, a village in Jammu and Kashmir
- Sangam, Nellore district, a village in Andhra Pradesh
- Sangam, Srikakulam district, a triveni sangam (triple confluence) in Andhra Pradesh
- Sangam (Warangal district), a mandal and village in Warangal district in Andhra Pradesh
- Sangama, Srirangapatna, a confluence of rivers in Karnataka
- Sangam-dong, a neighbourhood of Mapo-gu, Seoul, South Korea
- Sangam Stadium, the Seoul World Cup Stadium

== Education ==
- Sangam World Girl Guide/Girl Scout Center, located in Pune, Maharashtra, India

== Film and music ==
- Sangam (1964 Hindi film), an Indian Hindi-language romantic drama film by Raj Kapoor, starring Kapoor, Vyjayantimala and Rajendra Kumar
- Sangam (1964 Urdu film), a Pakistani Urdu feature film
- Sangam (1997 film), a Pakistani film by Syed Noor
- Sangama (film), a 2008 Indian Kannada-language film starring Ganesh and Vedhika
- Sangam (2014 film), an Indian Odia-language film starring Sidhant Mohapatra
- Sangam: Michael Nyman Meets Indian Masters a 2003 album by Michael Nyman and U. Srinivas
- Sangam (Charles Lloyd album), a 2004 jazz album by Charles Lloyd, with Zakir Hussain and Eric Harland
- Sangam (Trygve Seim album), 2004

== Other uses ==
- Sangama (human rights group), an LGBT rights group in India

== See also ==
- Sanga (disambiguation)
- Sangh (disambiguation)
- Sangha (disambiguation)
- Sangham (disambiguation)
- Katha Sangama (disambiguation)
- Sangamam (disambiguation)
- Sangamagrama, a town located in Kerala
- Kudalasangama, a temple town in Karnataka, India
