= Sanga =

Sanga may refer to:

== People ==
- Sanga, a Roman cognomen
- Rana Sanga (c. 1482–1528), king from the Sisodia dynasty
- Kumar Sangakkara (born 1977), Sri Lankan cricketer
- Sanga (wrestler) (born 1984), ring name of professional wrestler Saurav Gurjar

== Places ==
- Sanga, Angola, a town and commune in the municipality of Cela, Angola
- Sanga, Bhiwani, a village in the Haryana, India
- Sanga, Democratic Republic of the Congo, a village in Katanga Province, Democratic Republic of the Congo
- Sanga, Gabon, a village in Nyanga Province, Gabon
- Sanga, Ghana, a village in Tamale Metropolitan District, Northern Region, Ghana
- Sanga, Nigeria, a local government area of Kaduna State, Nigeria
- Sanga, Mali, a group of villages in Mopti region, Mali
- Sanga, Mozambique, a town in Sanga District, Mozambique
- Sanga District, a district of Mozambique
- Nasiksthan Sanga, a village development committee in Kavrepalanchok District, central Nepal
- Sanga, Uganda, a town in Kiruhura District, Western Region, Uganda

== Other uses ==
- Sanga people, an ethnic group in Katanga, Democratic Republic of Congo
- Sanga language (Bantu), a language of the Democratic Republic of Congo
- Sanga language (Nigeria), a language of Nigeria
- Sanga, a variety of Dogon spoken in and around Sanga, Mali
- Sanga cattle, various African cattle breeds
- Sanga, an Australian diminutive term for a sandwich
- SS Sanga, a Hansa A Type cargo ship in service 1944–45
- Sanga, a fictional character in the Indian Baahubali franchise

== See also ==
- Sangah, a Cameroonian dish
- Sangha (disambiguation)
- Sangam (disambiguation)
