= Fort of Kikombo =

- Location within Angola Location within Africa
- 11°19′11″S 13°49′13″E
- Location: Quicombo, Angola

The Little Fort of Kikombo is located in the town of Kikombo on the Atlantic coast of Angola, where Rio Kikombo reaches the ocean, in the province of Kwanza-sul.

== History ==
It is placed in the small bay of Kikombo, in the South of the Province of Kwanza- Sul. The little fort of "Kikombo" is linked to the history of Netherlander domination and of Portuguese reconquest. There was founded the Help Squadron of the Governor Francisco Soto Mayor in 1645 and later in 1648, the squadron of Salvador Correia, who, from there he left for the restoration of Luanda and Angola. The little fort is also linked to the slaves traffic, so it played the role of the Deposit and the embarkment of slaves that were captured in the factories of the interior, serving as its protection against the attacks made by the natives, showing resistance to the occupation of Angolan territory and above all against the negroes (slaves) traffic. It was classified as National Monument by the Provincial Decret n. 21 on 12 January 1924. It is relatively in good order and it is a state property. The responsibility for its maintenance and preservation concerns the Ministry of Culture.

== World Heritage Status ==
This site was added to the UNESCO World Heritage Tentative List on November 22, 1996 in the Cultural category.
