= Sangha (disambiguation) =

Sangha (from Sanskrit, saṃgha meaning 'assembly'), also spelled as Sangh, most often refers to:

- Sangha (Buddhism), the fourfold community of pious Buddhists, and sometimes refers specifically to the body of Buddhist clergy
- Sangha (Jainism), the fourfold community of pious followers of Jainism
- Sangat (Sikhism), the community of believers in Sikhism

Sangha or Sangh, may also refer to:

== Places ==
- Sangha, Mali, a rural commune in Mali
- Sangha Department (Burkina Faso), a department in eastern Burkina Faso
- Sangha Department (Republic of the Congo), a department in northern Congo-Brazzaville
- Sangha-Mbaéré, an economic prefecture in the Central African Republic
- Sangha Trinational, a forest in Central Africa
- Sangha River, a tributary of the Congo river of Central Africa

== Organisations ==
=== Hindutva ===
- Sangh Parivar, a family of Hindutva organisations in India, led by the RSS
- Rashtriya Swayamsevak Sangh (RSS), a right-wing Hindutva paramilitary organisation in India
- Bharatiya Jana Sangh, a former Hindutva political party in India which served as the political wing of the RSS
- Bharatiya Mazdoor Sangh, an Indian trade union affiliated with the RSS
- Hindu Swayamsevak Sangh, an international affiliate of the RSS

=== Others ===
- Arjak Sangh, a historical Indian organisation founded for the emancipation of Dalits
- Harijan Sevak Sangh, a historical non-profit organisation founded by Mahatma Gandhi to eradicate untouchability
- Saurashtra Khedut Sangh, a historical farmers' movement in Saurashtra, India
- Triveni Sangh, a historical social reform movement in Bihar, India
- Nepal Dalit Sangh, a Nepali Dalit movement affiliated with the Nepali Congress
- Nepal Dalit Sangh (Prajatantrik), a historical Nepali Dalit movement affiliated with the Nepali Congress
- Kisan Sangh, the first farmers' union in Fiji
- Vishal Sangh, a cane farmers' union in Fiji

== Other uses ==
- Sangha people of the Republic of the Congo
- Gaṇasaṅgha, a type of republic or oligarchy in the eastern part of the Indian subcontinent
- Sangha (Vidhan Sabha constituency), a constituency of the Sikkim Legislative Assembly in India reserved for the Buddhist monastic community
- Sangha (monk), a Chinese monk who lived in the Tang dynasty
- Sukhwinder Singh Sangha (1965–1990), an Indian Sikh militant

== See also ==
- Sanga (disambiguation)
- Sangam (disambiguation)
- Sang (disambiguation)
