= Bakhshali manuscript =

Ancient mathematical text

- Bodleian Library, University of Oxford
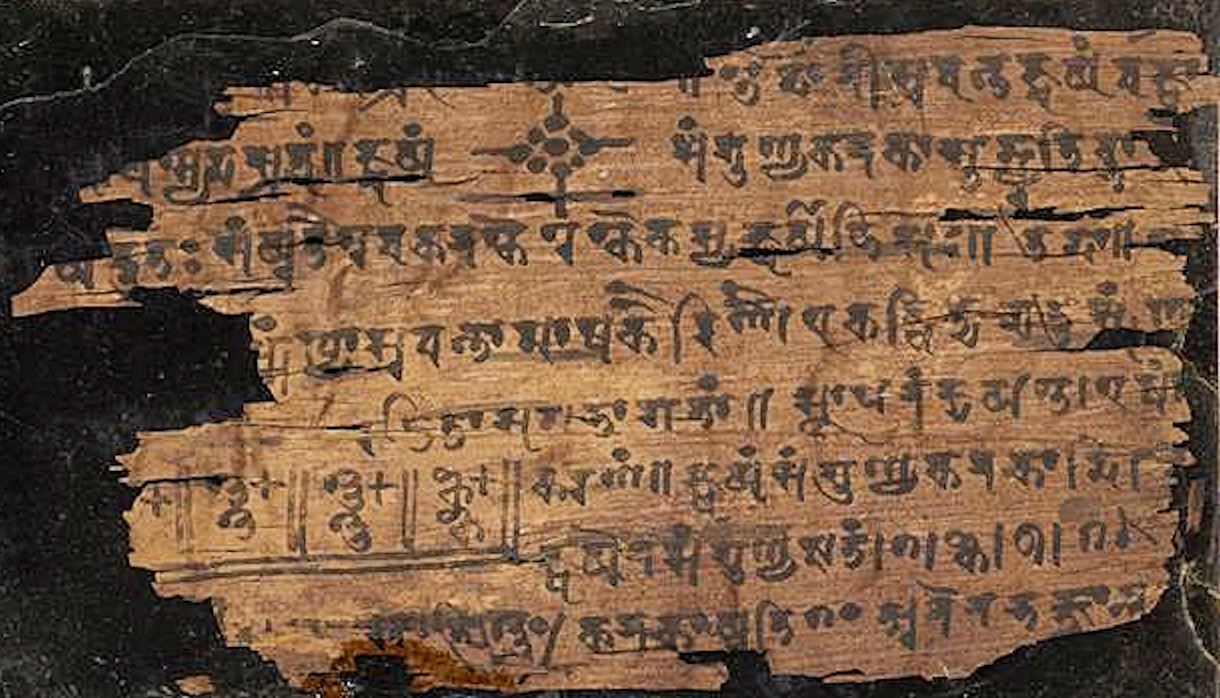
- One of the Bakhshali manuscripts.
- Type: Mathematical text
- Date: 799 - 1102 AD (9th - 11th century Approx) New Carbon dates published, on 14th of October 2024, Oxford University
- Place of origin: Bakhshali, (present-day) Pakistan
- Language: Sanskrit with influence from local dialects
- Material: Birch bark
- Format: Seventy leaves
- Condition: Too fragile to be handled
- Script: Sharada script
- Contents: maths text
- Discovered: 1881

The Bakhshali manuscript is an ancient Indian mathematical text written on birch bark that was found in 1881 in the village of Bakhshali, Mardan (near Peshawar in present-day Pakistan, historical Gandhara). It is perhaps "the oldest extant manuscript in Indian mathematics". In 2017, Oxford University carbon-dated samples taken from three folios to 224–383 CE and 885–993 CE. In October 2024, Oxford University revised their earlier dating to 799–1102 CE. The manner and timing of the publication of the 2017 test dates was criticised by a group of Indian mathematical historians (Plofker et al. 2017 and Houben 2018 §3). Up until September 2024 the manuscript was regarded as the earliest known Indian use of a zero symbol. It is written in a form of literary Sanskrit influenced by contemporary dialects.

== Discovery ==
The manuscript was unearthed in a field in 1881. It was unearthed by a peasant in the village of Bakhshali, which is near Mardan, in present-day Khyber Pakhtunkhwa, Pakistan. The first research on the manuscript was done by A. F. R. Hoernlé. After his death, it was examined by G.R.Kaye, who edited the work and published it as a book in 1927.

The extant manuscript is incomplete. It consists of 70 leaves of birch bark, whose intended order is not known. It is kept at the Bodleian Library at the University of Oxford (MS. Sansk. d. 14), though folio are periodically loaned to museums.

== Contents ==
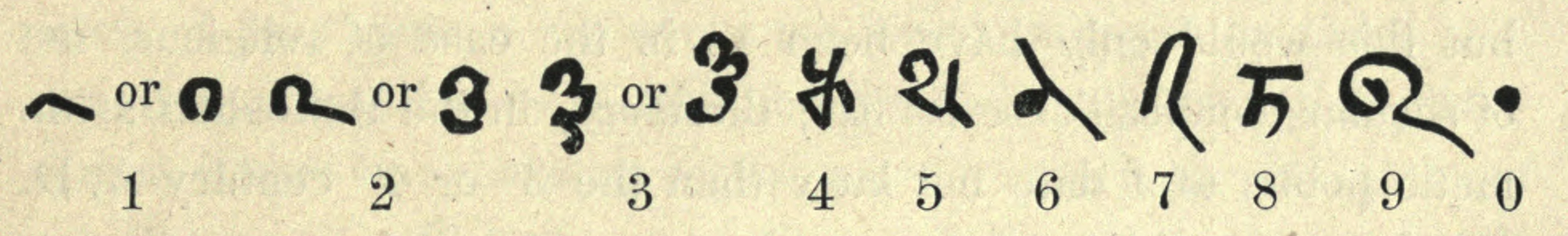
The numerals used in the Bakhshali manuscript, dated to sometime between the 3rd and 7th century AD.

The manuscript is a compendium of rules and illustrative examples. Each example is stated as a problem, the solution is described, and it is verified that the problem has been solved. The sample problems are in verse and the commentary is in prose associated with calculations. The problems involve arithmetic, algebra and geometry, including mensuration. The topics covered include fractions, square roots, arithmetic and geometric progressions, solutions of simple equations, simultaneous linear equations, quadratic equations and indeterminate equations of the second degree.

=== Composition ===
The manuscript is written in an earlier form of Sharada script, a script which is known for having been in use mainly from the 8th to the 12th century in the northwestern part of the Indian subcontinent, such as Kashmir and neighbouring regions. The language of the manuscript, (Note: Variously described either as an "irregular Sanskrit" (Kaye 2004, p. 11), or as the so-called Gāthā dialect, the literary form of the Northwestern Prakrit, which combined elements of Sanskrit and Prakrit and whose use as a literary language predated the adoption of Classical Sanskrit for this purposely.(Hoernle 1887, p. 10)) though intended to be Sanskrit, was significantly influenced in its phonetics and morphology by a local artist dialect or dialects, and some of the resultant linguistic peculiarities of the text are shared with Buddhist Hybrid Sanskrit. The overlying dialects, though sharing affinities with Apabhraṃśa and with Old Kashmiri, have not been identified precisely. It is probable that most of the rules and examples had been originally composed in Sanskrit, while one of the sections was written entirely in a dialect. It is possible that the manuscript might be a compilation of fragments from different works composed in a number of language varieties. Hayashi admits that some of the irregularities are due to errors by scribes or may be orthographical.

A colophon to one of the sections states that it was written by a brahmin identified as "the son of Chajaka", a "king of calculators," for the use of Vasiṣṭha's son Hasika. The brahmin might have been the author of the commentary as well as the scribe of the manuscript. Near the colophon appears a broken word rtikāvati, which has been interpreted as the place Mārtikāvata mentioned by Varāhamihira as being in northwestern India (along with Takṣaśilā, Gandhāra etc.), the supposed place where the manuscript might have been written.

=== Mathematics ===
The manuscript is a compilation of mathematical rules and examples (in verse), and prose commentaries on these verses. Typically, a rule is given, with one or more examples, where each example is followed by a "statement" (nyāsa / sthāpanā) of the example's numerical information in tabular form, then a computation that works out the example by following the rule step-by-step while quoting it, and finally a verification to confirm that the solution satisfies the problem. This is a style similar to that of Bhāskara I's commentary on the gaṇita (mathematics) chapter of the Āryabhaṭīya, including the emphasis on verification that became obsolete in later works.

The rules are algorithms and techniques for a variety of problems, such as systems of linear equations, quadratic equations, arithmetic progressions and arithmetico-geometric series, computing square roots approximately, dealing with negative numbers (profit and loss), measurement such as of the fineness of gold, etc.

Equality of Two Uniformly Accelerated Growths

Let, $S_1 = a + (a + d) + (a + 2d) + \ldots \text{ to } n \text{ terms,}$ $S_2 = b + (b + e) + (b + 2e) + \ldots \text{ to } n \text{ terms,}$

If these two are equal, we must have
$(n - 1)d + 2a = (n - 1)e + 2b$
$n = 2(b - a) / (d - e) + 1$

This formula is contained in Bakshali Manuscript, folio 4v, rule 17 (Kaye III, p. 176) as follows:

Ādyor viśeṣa dviguṇam cayasaṃdhiḥ-vibhājitam
Rūpādhikaṃ tathā kālaṃ gati sāmyam tadā bhavet.

"Twice the difference of the initial terms divided by the difference of the common differences is increased by one. That will be time (represented by $n$, cf. kāla iha padasyopalakṣaṇam) when the distances moved (by the two travellers) will be same."

Dvayāditricayaś caiva dvicayatryādikottaraḥ
Dvayo ca bhavate paṃthā kena kālena sāsyatāṃ kriyate?

The accompanying example reads: "The initial speed (of a traveller) is 2 and subsequent daily increment is 3. That of another, these are 3 initially and 2 as increment. Find in what time will their distances covered attain equality."

The working is lost, but the answer, by the formula in the previous example, $n = 2(3 - 2) / (3 - 2) + 1 = 3 \text{ days.}$

=== Numerals and zero ===
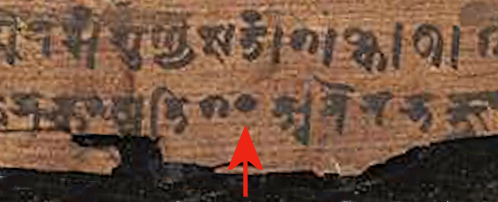
Bakhshali manuscript, detail of the numeral "zero".

The Bakhshali manuscript uses numerals with a place-value system, using a dot as a place holder for zero. The dot symbol came to be called the shunya-bindu (literally, the dot of the empty place). References to the concept are found in Subandhu's Vasavadatta, which has been dated between 385 and 465 by the scholar Maan Singh even though the dates are disputed by other scholars

Prior to the 2017 carbon dating, a 9th-century inscription of zero on the wall of a temple in Gwalior, Madhya Pradesh, was once thought to be the oldest Indian use of a zero symbol.

== Date ==
In 2017, samples from 3 folios of the corpus were radiocarbon dated to three different centuries and empires: 224–383 CE for folio 16 (Indo-Scythian), 680–779 CE for folio 17 (Turk Shahis), and 885–993 CE for folio 33 (Saffarid dynasty). If the dates are valid, it is unclear how folios from different centuries came to be collected and buried.

However, on 14 October 2024, Oxford University, having revised its findings from a second run of carbon dating tests in 2018, dated the Bakshali manuscripts to 799 - 1102 CE, with folio 16 being redated to 931-1032 CE.

Calibrated Radiocarbon date ranges, 95.4% confidence interval, AD
Folio	Age (2017)	Age (2024)
15		773-986
16	224-383	931-1032
17	680-868	
23		890-1014
33	885-993	885-995
55		774-991

The publication of the radio carbon dates, initially via non-academic media, led Kim Plofker, Agathe Keller, Takao Hayashi, Clemency Montelle and Dominik Wujastyk to publicly object to the library making the dates globally available, usurping academic precedence:

We express regret that the Bodleian Library kept their carbon-dating findings embargoed for many months, and then chose a newspaper press-release and YouTube as media for a first communication of these technical and historical matters. The Library thus bypassed standard academic channels that would have permitted serious collegial discussion and peer review prior to public announcements. While the excitement inspired by intriguing discoveries benefits our field and scholarly research in general, the confusion generated by broadcasting over-eager and carelessly inferred conclusions, with their inevitable aftermath of caveats and disputes, does not.

— Plofker et al., The Bakhshālī Manuscript: A Response to the Bodleian Library’s Radiocarbon Dating, 2017

Referring to the detailed reconsideration of the evidence by Plofker et al., Sanskrit scholar, Jan Houben remarked:

If the finding that samples of the same manuscript would be centuries apart is not based on mistakes ... there are still some factors that have evidently been overlooked by the Bodleian research team: the well-known divergence in exposure to cosmic radiation at different altitudes and the possible variation in background radiation due to the presence of certain minerals in exposed, mountainous rock have nowhere been taken into account.

Prior to the proposed radiocarbon dates of the 2017 study, most scholars agreed that the physical manuscript was a copy of a more ancient text, whose date had to be estimated partly on the basis of its content. Hoernlé thought that the manuscript was from the 9th century, but the original was from the 3rd or 4th century. (Note: G. R. Kaye, on the other hand, thought in 1927 that the work was composed in the 12th century, but this was discounted in recent scholarship. G. G. Joseph wrote, "It is particularly unfortunate that Kaye is still quoted as an authority on Indian mathematics.") Indian scholars assigned it an earlier date. Datta assigned it to the "early centuries of the Christian era". Channabasappa dated it to AD 200–400, on the grounds that it uses mathematical terminology different from that of Aryabhata. Hayashi noted some similarities between the manuscript and Bhaskara I's work (AD 629), and said that it was "not much later than Bhaskara I".

To settle the date of the Bakhshali manuscript, language use and especially palaeography are other major parameters to be taken into account. In this context Houben observed: "it is difficult to derive a linear chronological difference from the observed linguistic variation," and therefore it is necessary to "take quite seriously the judgement of palaeographists such as Richard Salomon who observed that, what he teleologically called “Proto-Śāradā,” “first emerged around the middle of the seventh century” (Salomon 1998: 40). This excludes the earlier dates attributed to manuscript folios on which a fully developed form of Śāradā appears."

== See also ==
- Birch bark manuscript
- Bakhshali approximation
- Indian mathematics
- Zero (number)

== Bibliography ==
- Hayashi, Takao (1995). The Bakhshālī manuscript: an ancient Indian mathematical treatise. Groningen Oriental studies. Groningen: Egbert Forsten. ISBN 978-90-6980-087-5.
- Hoernle, Augustus (1887), On the Bakshali manuscript, Vienna: Alfred Hölder (Editor of the Court and of the University)
- Kaye, George Rusby (2004) [1927]. The Bakhshālī manuscripts: a study in medieval mathematics. New Delhi: Aditya Prakashan. ISBN 978-81-7742-058-6.
- Plofker, Kim; Agathe Keller; Takao Hayashi; Clemency Montelle; and Dominik Wujastyk. "The Bakhshālī Manuscript: A Response to the Bodleian Library’s Radiocarbon Dating" History of Science in South Asia, 5.1: 134–150. doi:10.18732/H2XT07
