= Coçoço =

- Coordinates: 11°20′0″S 15°17′0″E
- Country: Angola
- Province: Cuanza Sul
- Municipality: Cela Municipality

Coçoço is a populated place in the Cuanza Sul Province of Angola. It is located in the jurisdiction of Uaco Cungo.
