= Sphuṭacandrāpti =

Indian astronomical treatise

- Author: Madhava of Sangamagrama (c.1350 – c.1425)
- Language: Sanskrit
- Subject: Astronomy/Mathematics
- Publisher: K. V. Sarma has brought out in 1973 a critical edition of the treatise with an introduction, translation and notes in English.
- Publication place: India

Sphuṭacandrāpti (Computation of True Moon) is a treatise in Sanskrit composed by the fourteenth-century CE Kerala astronomer-mathematician Sangamagrama Madhava. The treatise enunciates a method for the computation of the position of the moon at intervals of 40 minutes each throughout the day. This is one of only two works of Madhava that have survived to modern times, the other one being Veṇvāroha. However, both Sphuṭacandrāpti and Veṇvāroha have more or less the same contents, that of the latter being apparently a more refined version of that of the former.

== Critical editions ==
K. V. Sarma while working in Vishveshvaranand Institute of Sanskrit and Indological Studies, Hoshiarpur, has brought out in 1973 a critical edition of the treatise with an introduction, translation and notes.

== See also ==
- Indian mathematics
- Indian mathematicians
- Kerala school of astronomy and mathematics
