= Sangha Department =

Sangha Department may refer to:

- Sangha Department (Burkina Faso)
- Sangha Department (Republic of the Congo)
