= Mahadevi (astronomy book) =

Astronomy table

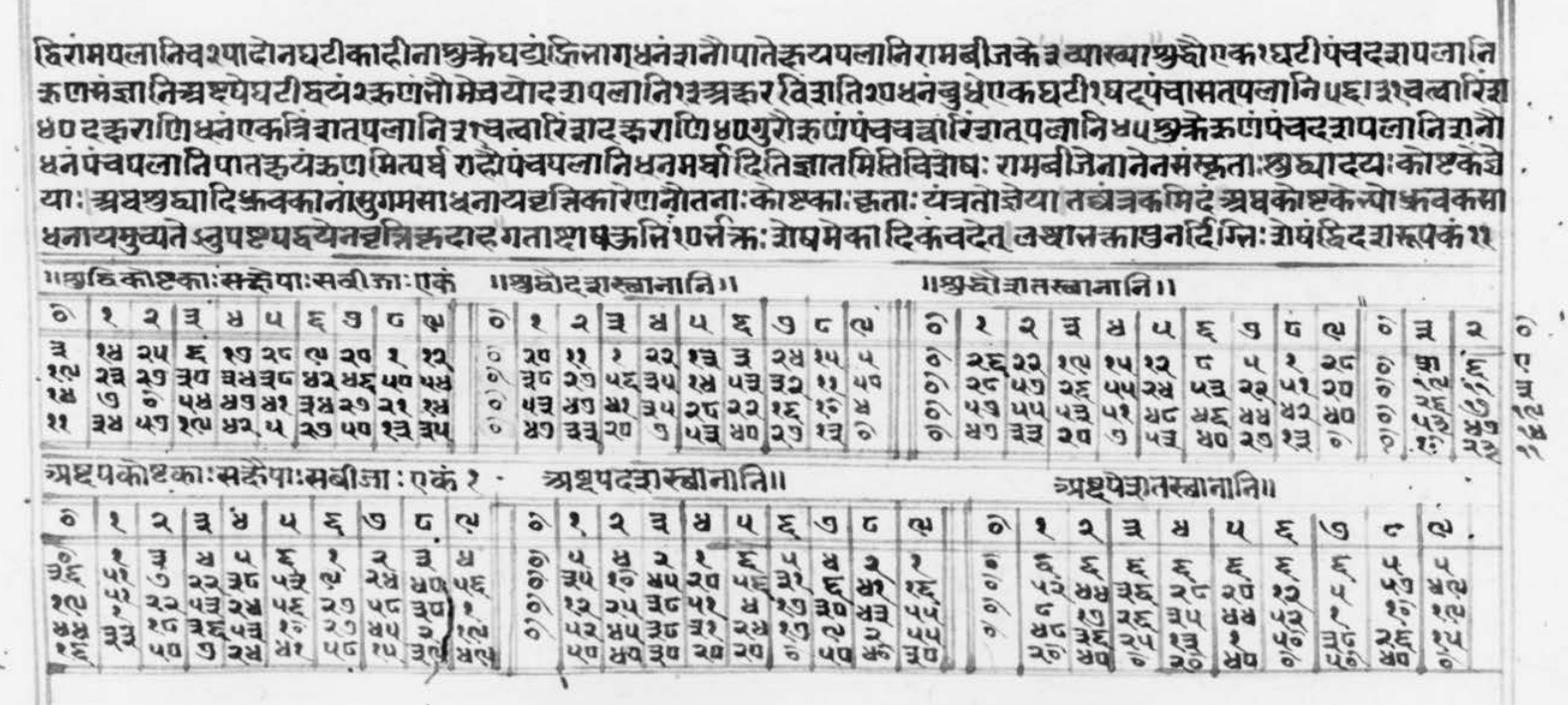
A page of the Sanskrit astronomical table text Mahadevi with Dipika commentary (Internet Archive)

Mahādevī is a Sanskrit astronomical table text composed by the Indian astronomer-mathematician Mahādeva around the year 1316 CE. Since its composition, it has become the standard astronomical table among astronomers, astrologers and calendar makers in the Brāhma-pakṣa school. More than a hundred manuscripts of the work have been unearthed, which is far more numerous than the surviving manuscripts of any earlier koṣṭhaka, the word by which such table texts are referred to in Sanskrit, Mahādevī has been described as the "first 'canonical' koṣṭhaka". In the history of studies on Sanskrit astronomical table texts, Mahādevī was the first such text to be subjected to a systematic analysis using modern mathematical tools.

== Features ==
There are several important features of Mahādevī that might have helped in spreading its acceptance among a wide cross section of astronomers and astrologers across India.

Mahādevī is an astronomical table text of the Brāhma-pakṣa school. This school uses the values of the fundamental parameters, namely, the values of the celestial bodies’ revolution-numbers and consequent mean velocities, as given in the Brāhmasphuṭasiddhānta of Brahmagupta composed in 628 CE. Its main region of influence in is the northern and western areas of India. The work presents more than 300 tables including "tables for single-year and 60-year mean longitudinal displacement tables for the epact, the lord of the year, the moon, the lunar node, and the five planets, along with a bīja for each of these entities. The bulk of its content, however, consists of the sixty annual true longitude tables given for each of the five planets, each table containing 27 longitudes at intervals of 14 days, as specified in the verse."

In Mahādevī, the planetary true longitudes are expressed in 6° arc-units or sixtieths of a circle and their sexagesimal fractions. This is more convenient than the nakṣatra units of 13° 20′ because they are more easily converted to or from the standard measures of zodiacal signs and degrees.

A very important feature of the book is that it has an abundance of tables and data. The use of smaller unit of 6° arc-units helps in reducing the size of interpolation intervals. The work contains a large amount of compactly organized data per argument value. Each entry for true longitude is accompanied by the tabulated difference between that entry and the corresponding one in the next table, simplifying the task of interpolation between tables. The true velocity and its inter-tabular differences are similarly tabulated. Finally, occurrences of synodic phenomena are noted next to the longitude entries where they occur.

There are no verbal instructions on how to use these tables. With its total verse text amounting to less than 50 verses, the Mahādevī avoids duplication of computational techniques. No algorithms are prescribed as (potentially confusing) alternatives to use of the tables.

== Laghumahādevī ==
Laghumahādevī is a condensed version of Mahādevī composed by an anonymous author sometimes around 1578 CE. The condensation is achieved by using 18° arc-units instead of 6° arc-units and copying every third value of the Mahādevī tables,

== See also ==
- Makarandasārini
- Rājamṛgāṅka (astronomy book)

== Additional reading ==
- For a detailed mathematical analysis of the tables in Maahādevī: O. Neugebauer and David Pingree (April 1967). "The Astronomical Tables of Mahādeva". Proceedings of the American Philosophical Society. 111 (2): 69–92.
- Clemency Montelle and Kim Plofker (2018). Sanskrit Astronomical Tables. Springer. ISBN 978-3-319-97036-3.
- For Mahādevī with a commentary called Dīpikā, composed in 1636 A. D. by Dhanaraja: Mahadevi Of Mahadev With Dipika (Internet Archive)
- Agathe Keller, Koolakodlu Mahesh, Clemency Montelle. "History of Numerical Tables in Sanskrit Sources". shs.hal.science. HAL Open Science.
