= Quibala =

Quibala Kibala
- Municipality and town
- Location within Angola
- Coordinates: 10°44′S 14°59′E
- Country: Angola
- Province: Cuanza Sul

Area
  - Land: 10,300 km^{2} (4,000 sq mi)
- Elevation: 1,375 m (4,511 ft)

Population (mid 2019)
  - Total: 163,991
  - Density: 16/km^{2} (41/sq mi)
- Climate: Aw

Quibala (also written Kibala) is a town, with a population of 27,128 (2014 census), and a municipality in Cuanza Sul, Angola. The municipality has a population of 142,057 (2014 census) and comprises an area of 10,300 km^{2}. It is bordered by the city of Calulo in the north, by the town of Waku-Kungo in the east, by the municipality of Ebo in the south, and in the west by the municipality of Gabela and by Porto Amboim.

The novelist Chó do Guri was born in Quibala in 1959.
