= Makarandasarini =

Astronomy table

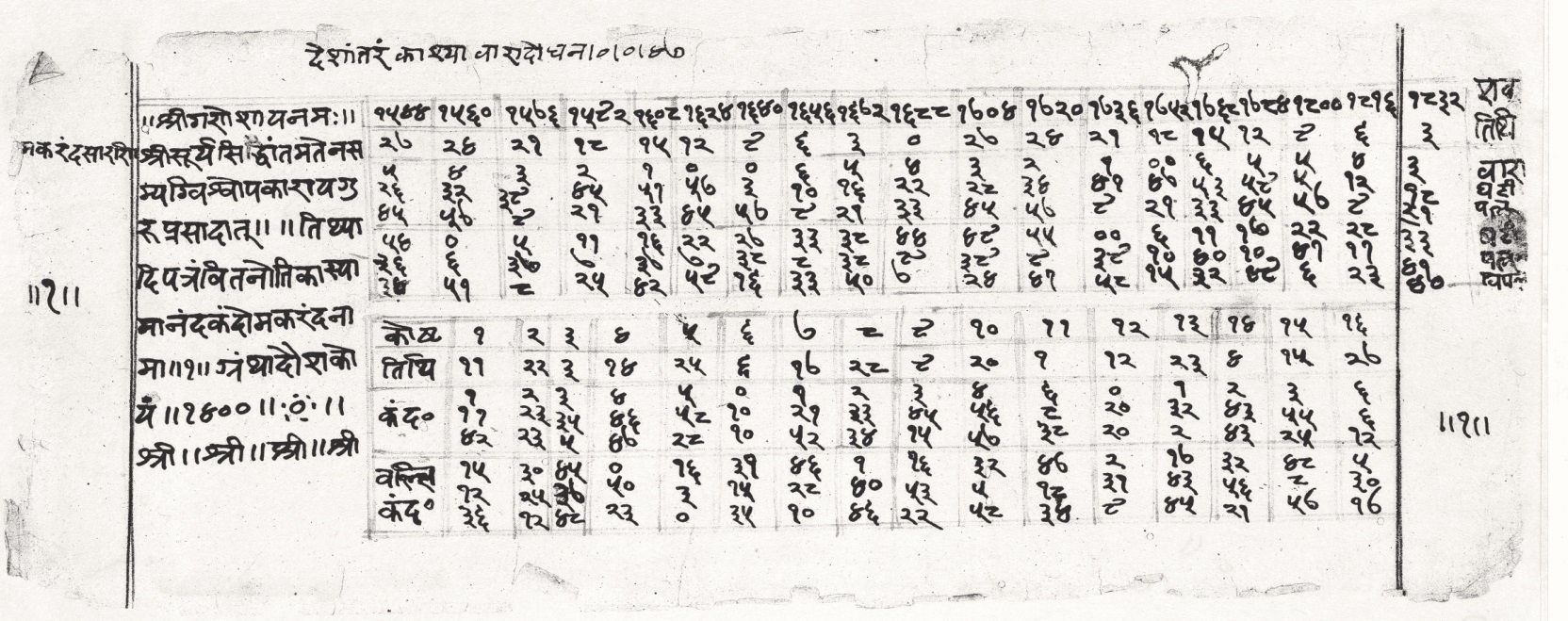
First page of a manuscript of the astronomical table text Makarandasarini (Internet Archive)

Makarandasāriṇi is a Sanskrit astronomical table text composed by the Indian astronomer-mathematician Makaranda (c.1438-1478) hailing from Varanasi. In the Sanskrit astronomical literature such table texts are referred to as sāriṇi-s or koṣṭhaka-s. (The word sāriṇi may be loosely translated as “stream, path, line”.) It is one of the most popular such texts ever composed in Sanskrit.

== Important features ==
Makarandasāriṇi follows the Saurapakṣa. This is the midnight-epoch system embodied in a recension of the Sūryasiddhānta dating to around the eighth century. This is reflected in the choices of the values of the fundamental parameters, like the values of the celestial bodies’ revolution-numbers and consequent mean velocities. Another unique feature of Makarandasāriṇi is the use of vegetation-themed Sanskrit technical terms for its various tables. The table giving the mean position increments has been called vāṭikā (garden) and the table giving calendar day/time for mean time unit has been called guccha (blossom, flower). There are tables named valli-s (creeper) and saurabhaṃ-s (fragrance, perfume). In comparison to most other sāriṇi-s or koṣṭhakā-s, Makarandasāriṇi has no accompanying set of verses except for an invocatory stanza at the beginning of the text.

== Contents ==
Among other things, the book has tables relating to the following:

1. the ending moments of tithi, and yoga
2. the mean longitudes of the Sun, the Moon and the five tārāgraha-s viz, Kuja (Mars), Budha (Mercury), Guru (Jupiter), Śukra (Venus) and Śani (Saturn),
3. the mandaphala (equation of the centre) of each of the heavenly bodies,
4. the equation of the conjunction of the five planets,
5. the moments of solar ingress (saṅkarmaṅa) into the rāśi-s (zodiacal signs) and nakṣatra-s (the twenty-seven asterisms)
6. the Sun's declination (krānti)
7. the latitude (śara, 'vikṣepa) of the Moon
8. the angular diameters (bimba) of the Sun, the Moon and the Earth’s shadow-cone (bhūcchāyā, bhūrbhā) for computing lunar and solar eclipses.

== Commentaries ==
There are a large number of commentaries on Makarandasāriṇi in circulation. These commentaries provide detailed instructions on how to use the tables sometimes with elaborate worked examples. The following is only a partial list of these commentaries.

- Makarandapañcāṅgopapatti of Ḍhuṇḍhirāja (fl. 1590)
- Makarandavivaraṇa of Divākara (b. 1606)
- Makarandapaddhatikārikā of Harikarṇa (fl. 1610)
- Abhinavatāmarasa of Purus.ottama Bhaṭṭa (fl. ca. 1610)
- Makarandodāharaṇa of Viśvaātha (fl. 1612/1630)
- Makarandaṭippaṇa of Moreśvara (1622 CE)
- Subodhikā of Kṣemaṅkara Miśra (fl. 1632)
- Makarandakārikā of Kṛpārāma Miśra (fl. 1815)
- vāsanā of Nīlāmbara Jhā (b. 18 July 1823)
- udāharaṇa of Jīvanātha Jhā (fl. ca. 1846/1900)

== See also ==
- Mahadevi (astronomy book)
- Rājamṛgāṅka (astronomy book)

== Additional reading ==
- Clemency Montelle and Kim Plofker (2018). Sanskrit Astronomical Tables. Springer. ISBN 978-3-319-97036-3.
- David Pingree (1973). Sanskrit Astronomical Tables In England. Madras (Chennai): The Kuppuswami Sastri Research Institute.
- Vishnunath (1923). Makaranda Sarini. (Name of publisher not mentioned. Digitized from Digital Library of India.)
- Balachandra Rao S, Rupa K and Padmaja Venugopal (2013). "An analysis of the mandaphala tables of Makaranda and revision of parameters" (PDF). Ganita Bharati. 35 (1).
