= Chó do Guri =

Maria de Fátima - better known by her pen name Cho do Guri - (24 January 1959 – 7 July 2017) was an Angolan poet and writer.

== Biography ==
Fatima was born on January 24, 1959, in Quibala, Cuanza Sul Province in Portuguese Angola. She is the daughter of an Angolan mother and a German father. At two years of age she came to Luanda where she lived with her mother in the Bairro Operario. At the age of four, her mother took Fátima to a house for disadvantaged children because she could no longer feed her. She developed an interest in poetry at a young age and published her first poem in 1988, in the newspaper Mural da Associação de Estudantes Angolanos em Portugal. Fatima received her primary and secondary education in Luanda. She studied pharmaceutical sciences at the Faculty of Pharmacy at the University of Lisbon, Portugal. She graduated in social policy by the Open University of Lisbon.

Her first book, Vivências, was published in 1996. Chiquito de Camuxiba was published in 2006 and received the African Literature Prize from the Institute of Valle Flor Marquis. Drawing on her childhood experiences, A filha do Alemão (The German Daughter) came out in 2007 and is about the unwanted mulatto children in Angola. The story took almost two decades to write and originally was titled A Filha do Pecado (The Daughter of Sin). Economist António Fonseca praised the novel, calling it a "great benefit to study the recent history of Angola" at the same time allowing a person to better understand "the new social classes of Angola" and "know the soul and the recent history" of the country.

In 2009, A filha do Alemão was translated into German by the Goethe Institute. It was part of the official opening of the program of the German Cultural Centre, in Luanda. Chó do Guri has had several poems published in anthologies in Angola and Brazil. She worked as a columnist for the weekly newspaper Folha 8.

== Works ==
- Vivências (1996)
- Bairro Operário - a minha história (1998)
- Morfeu (2000)
- Chiquito de Camuxiba (2006)
- Na Boca Árida da kyanda (2006)
- A filha do Alemão (2007)
- Songuito e Katite (2009)
- O Cambulador (2013)
- Pulas, Bumbas, Companhia Limitada e muita Cuca (2016)
