= Waco Airport =

Waco Airport may refer to:

- TSTC Waco Airport (CNW) near Waco, Texas, USA
- Waco Kungo Airport (CEO) near Uaco Cungo, Angola
- Waco Regional Airport (ACT) near Waco, Texas, USA
