= Mithila Vishwavidyalaya Panchang =

Panchang of Mithila region

- Original title: विश्वविद्यालय पंचांग
- Country: India
- Language: Sanskrit
- Genre: Panchang
- Publisher: Kameshwar Singh Darbhanga Sanskrit
- Published: Annually (since 1977)
- Media type: Print
- No. of books: 47 Years of Panchang

Mithila Vishwavidyalaya Panchang (Sanskrit: मिथिला विश्वविधालय पञ्चांग) is an Indian annual panchang published by Kameshwar Singh Darbhanga Sanskrit University every year. It is also known as simply Vishwavidyalaya Panchang or Mithila Panchang or Mithila Raj Panchang.

== Description ==
Mithila Vishwavidyalaya Panchang is a special and important panchang in the Hindu tradition of the Mithila region in the Indian Subcontinent. This panchang is based on the summary of the ancient text Makrand. It is being published since past 47 years by Kameshwar Singh Darbhanga Sanskrit University. The panchang is prepared by the conclusion of a Pandit Mahasabha. The Pandit Mahasabha is organized by the university, where Pandits across the country and from abroad gather and discuss and debate on the Panchang. It is said that due the discussion of the Pandit Mahasabha, there is never an error in the panchang.

The publication of the Vishwavidyalaya Panchang was started in 1978–1979 by the then Vice Chancellor Dr Ramkaran Sharma of the university. According to the former vice chancellor cum Jyotishacharya Dr Ramchandra Jha, the panchang is based on the Suryasidhanta and the mathematics of Makaranda and it is prepared according to the rules of Hindu religious texts. The auspicious time and date determined in the Panchang are basically based on the culture and traditions of Mithila region. The Vishwavidyalaya Panchang is the most authentic panchang followed by the people of Mithila region in the Indian Subcontinent for the practices of the cultural, ritual and religious ceremonies, etc. The panchang gives direction to the traditional activities of Mithila region. Apart from Mithila region the popularity of the almanac has extended to abroad also.
