= Madhava of Sangamagrama =

Indian mathematician and astronomer (1340–1425)

Mādhava of Sangamagrāma
- സംഗമഗ്രാമം മാധവൻ
- Born: c. 1340; Sangamagrama, Kingdom of Cochin (modern day Irinjalakuda, Kerala, India)
- Died: c. 1425 (aged 75–85); Cochin, Vijayanagara Empire (modern day Kerala, India)
- Occupation: Astronomer-mathematician
- Known for: Discovery of power series Expansions of trigonometric Sine, Cosine and Arctangent functions Infinite series summation formulae for π
- Notable work: Golavāda, Madhyāmanayanaprakāra, Veṇvāroha, Sphuṭacandrāpti
- Title: Golavid (Master of Spherics)

Mādhava of Sangamagrāma (Mādhavan) (c. 1340 – c. 1425) was an Indian mathematician and astronomer (jyotirvid) who founded the Kerala school of astronomy and mathematics. Following the traditional Indian approach of Gaṇita-Jyotiṣa (mathematical astronomy), Madhava made pioneering contributions to the study of infinite series, trigonometry, spherical geometry, algebra, and analysis. He was the first to use infinite series approximations for a range of trigonometric functions, which has been called the "decisive step onward from the finite procedures of ancient mathematics to treat their limit-passage to infinity".

== Biography ==
Little is known about Madhava's life with certainty. However, from scattered references to Madhava found in diverse manuscripts, historians of Kerala school have pieced together information about the mathematician. In a manuscript preserved in the Oriental Institute, Baroda, Madhava has been referred to as Mādhavan vēṇvārōhādīnām karttā ... Mādhavan Ilaññippaḷḷi Emprān. It has been noted that the epithet 'Emprān' refers to the Emprāntiri community, to which Madhava might have belonged.

The term "Ilaññippaḷḷi" has been identified as a reference to the residence of Madhava. This is corroborated by Madhava himself. In his short work on the moon's positions titled Veṇvāroha, Madhava says that he was born in a house named bakuḷādhiṣṭhita . . . vihāra. This is clearly Sanskrit for Ilaññippaḷḷi. Ilaññi is the Malayalam name of the evergreen tree Mimusops elengi and the Sanskrit name for the same is Bakuḷa. Palli is a term for village. The Sanskrit house name bakuḷādhiṣṭhita . . . vihāra has also been interpreted as a reference to the Malayalam house name Iraññi ninna ppaḷḷi and some historians have tried to identify it with one of two currently existing houses with names Iriññanavaḷḷi and Iriññārapaḷḷi both of which are located near Irinjalakuda town in central Kerala. This identification is far fetched because both names have neither phonetic similarity nor semantic equivalence to the word "Ilaññippaḷḷi".

Most of the writers of astronomical and mathematical works who lived after Madhava's period have referred to Madhava as "Sangamagrama Madhava" and as such it is important that the real import of the word "Sangamagrama" be made clear. The general view among many scholars is that Sangamagrama is the town of Irinjalakuda some 70 kilometers south of the Nila river and about 70 kilometers north of Cochin. It seems that there is not much concrete ground for this belief except perhaps the fact that the presiding deity of an early medieval temple in the town, the Koodalmanikyam Temple, is worshiped as Sangameswara meaning the Lord of the Samgama and so Samgamagrama can be interpreted as the village of Samgameswara. But there are several places in Karnataka with samgama or its equivalent kūḍala in their names and with a temple dedicated to Samgamḗsvara, the lord of the confluence. (Kudalasangama in Bagalkot district is one such place with a celebrated temple dedicated to the Lord of the Samgama.)

There is a small town on the southern banks of the Nila river, around 10 kilometers upstream from Tirunavaya, called Kūḍallūr. The exact literal Sanskrit translation of this place name is Samgamagram: kūṭal in Malayalam means a confluence (which in Sanskrit is samgama) and ūr means a village (which in Sanskrit is grama). Also the place is at the confluence of the Nila river and its most important tributary, namely, the Kunti River. (There is no confluence of rivers near Irinjalakuada.) Incidentally, there is a Nambudiri (Malayali Brahmin) family by name Kūtallūr Mana, a few kilometers from the Kudallur village. The family has its origins in Kudallur village itself. For many generations this family hosted a great Gurukulam specialising in Vedanga. That the only available manuscript of Sphuṭacandrāpti, a book authored by Madhava, was obtained from the manuscript collection of Kūtallūr Mana might strengthen the conjecture that Madhava might have had some association with Kūtallūr Mana. Thus the most plausible possibility is that the forefathers of Madhava migrated from the Tulu land or thereabouts to settle in Kudallur village, which is situated on the southern banks of the Nila river not far from Tirunnavaya, a generation or two before his birth and lived in a house known as Ilaññippaḷḷi whose present identity is unknown.

Much like his fellow astronomers, Madhava's work was focused on Jyotisha, a Vedānga (auxiliary discipline) of ancient Indian science which focuses on celestial movements, timekeeping (kālaguṇanā), and calendar construction. He formulated accurate sine tables, lunar computations (Veṇvāroha), and infinite series. These were composed in precise Sanskrit verses (ślokas) or in Katapayadi mnemonics.

=== Date ===
There are also no definite evidence to pinpoint the period during which Madhava flourished. In his Venvaroha, Madhava gives a date in 1400 CE as the epoch. Madhava's pupil Parameshvara Nambudiri, the only known direct pupil of Madhava, is known to have completed his seminal work Drigganita in 1430 and the Paramesvara's date has been determined as c. 1360-1455. From such circumstantial evidences historians have assigned the date c. 1340 – c. 1425 to Madhava.

== Historiography ==
Mathematical astronomy has been practised over a long time in Kerala through Aryabhatiya tradition and the Parahita system introduced earlier by Haridatta in the 7th century CE. However, the references from later scholars suggest that Madhava provided the creative impulse for advanced analysis based rich mathematical tradition in Kerala school. However, except for a couple, most of Madhava's original works have been lost. He is referred to in the work of subsequent Kerala mathematicians, particularly in Nilakantha Somayaji's Tantrasangraha (c. 1500), as the source for several infinite series expansions, including sin θ and arctan θ. The 16th-century text Mahajyānayana prakāra (Method of Computing Great Sines) cites Madhava as the source for several series derivations for π. In Jyeṣṭhadeva's Yuktibhāṣā (c. 1530), written in Malayalam, these series are presented with proofs in terms of the Taylor series expansions for polynomials like 1/(1+x^{2}), with x = tan θ, etc.

Thus, what is explicitly Madhava's work is a source of some debate. The Yukti-dipika (also called the Tantrasangraha-vyakhya), possibly composed by Sankara Variar, a student of Jyeṣṭhadeva, presents several versions of the series expansions for sin θ, cos θ, and arctan θ, as well as some products with radius and arclength, most versions of which appear in Yuktibhāṣā. For those that do not, Rajagopal and Rangachari have argued, quoting extensively from the original Sanskrit, that since some of these have been attributed by Nilakantha to Madhava, some of the other forms might also be the work of Madhava.

Others have speculated that the early text Karanapaddhati (c. 1375–1475), or the Mahajyānayana prakāra was written by Madhava, but this is unlikely.

Karanapaddhati, along with the even earlier Keralite mathematics text Sadratnamala, as well as the Tantrasangraha and Yuktibhāṣā, were considered in an 1834 article by C. M. Whish, which was the first to draw attention to their priority over Newton in discovering the Fluxion (Newton's name for differentials). In the mid-20th century, the Russian scholar Jushkevich revisited the legacy of Madhava, and a comprehensive look at the Kerala school was provided by Sarma in 1972.

== Scholarly lineage (Guru-śiṣya paramparā) ==
Illustration accompanying a proof of the Pythagorean theorem in Yuktibhāṣā

The educational system in Kerala ran through Guru-śiṣya paramparā. Earlier astronomers included Kǖṭalur Kizhār (2nd century CE), Vararuci (who initiated the Kaṭapayādi systems, 4th century CE) and Śaṅkaranārāyaṇa (author of the Laghubhāskarīyavivaraṇa, 869 CE). After Madhava, the succession was carried out by several direct and indirect disciples for multiple generations. Parameshvara was a direct disciple. According to a palm leaf manuscript of a Malayalam commentary on the Surya Siddhanta, Parameswara's son Damodara (c. 1400–1500) had Nilakantha Somayaji as one of his disciples. Jyeshtadeva was a disciple of Nilakantha. Achyutha Pisharadi of Trikkantiyur is mentioned as a disciple of Jyeṣṭhadeva, and the grammarian Melpathur Narayana Bhattathiri as his disciple..

== Contributions ==
If mathematics is viewed as a progression from finite algebraic procedures toward the study of infinite processes, an important development in this transition was the systematic use of infinite series. Madhava of Sangamagrama is credited with deriving several infinite series, including series for trigonometric functions and π, centuries before comparable developments in Europe. Madhava and later Kerala mathematicians also employed correction terms (antyasaṃskāra) to improve approximations obtained by truncating infinite series. Their work demonstrates a sophisticated understanding of infinite processes, approximation, and the correction of truncation errors, although it is preferable to distinguish these methods from the formal theory of limits and mathematical analysis that developed much later in Europe.In Europe, the first such series was developed by James Gregory in 1667.

However, as stated above, which results are precisely Madhava's and which are those of his successors is difficult to determine. The following presents a summary of results that have been attributed to Madhava by various scholars.

=== Infinite series ===
Among his many contributions, he discovered infinite series for the trigonometric functions of sine, cosine, arctangent, and many methods for calculating the circumference of a circle. One of Madhava's series is known from the text Yuktibhāṣā, which contains the derivation and proof of the power series for inverse tangent, discovered by Madhava. In the text, Jyeṣṭhadeva describes the series in the following manner:

The first term is the product of the given sine and radius of the desired arc divided by the cosine of the arc. The succeeding terms are obtained by a process of iteration when the first term is repeatedly multiplied by the square of the sine and divided by the square of the cosine. All the terms are then divided by the odd numbers 1, 3, 5, .... The arc is obtained by adding and subtracting respectively the terms of odd rank and those of even rank. It is laid down that the sine of the arc or that of its complement whichever is the smaller should be taken here as the given sine. Otherwise the terms obtained by this above iteration will not tend to the vanishing magnitude.

This yields:

$$r\theta={\frac {r\sin  \theta  }{\cos  \theta
}}-(1/3)\,r\,{\frac { \left(\sin \theta   \right) ^
{3}}{ \left(\cos  \theta   \right) ^{3}}}+(1/5)\,r\,{\frac {
\left(\sin \theta  \right) ^{5}}{ \left(\cos
\theta  \right) ^{5}}}-(1/7)\,r\,{\frac { \left(\sin \theta
\right) ^{7}}{ \left(\cos \theta  \right) ^{
7}}} + \cdots$$

or equivalently:

$$\theta = \tan \theta - \frac{\tan^3 \theta}{3} + \frac{\tan^5 \theta}{5} - \frac{\tan^7 \theta}{7} + \cdots$$

This series is Gregory's series (named after James Gregory, who rediscovered it three centuries after Madhava). Even if we consider this particular series as the work of Jyeṣṭhadeva, it would pre-date Gregory by a century, and certainly other infinite series of a similar nature had been worked out by Madhava. Today, it is referred to as the Madhava-Gregory-Leibniz series.

=== Trigonometry ===
Madhava composed an accurate table of sines. Madhava's values are accurate to the seventh decimal place. Marking a quarter circle at twenty-four equal intervals, he gave the lengths of the half-chord (sines) corresponding to each of them. It is believed that he may have computed these values based on the series expansions:

sin q = q − q^{3}/3! + q^{5}/5! − q^{7}/7! + ...
cos q = 1 − q^{2}/2! + q^{4}/4! − q^{6}/6! + ...

=== The value of π (pi) ===
Madhava's work on the value of the mathematical constant Pi is cited in the Mahajyānayana prakāra ("Methods for the great sines"). While some scholars such as Sarma feel that this book may have been composed by Madhava himself, it is more likely the work of a 16th-century successor. This text attributes most of the expansions to Madhava, and gives the following infinite series expansion of π, now known as the Madhava-Leibniz series:

$$\frac{\pi}{4} = 1 - \frac{1}{3} + \frac{1}{5} - \frac{1}{7} + \cdots = \sum_{n=1}^\infty \frac{(-1)^{n-1}}{2n - 1},$$

which he obtained from the power-series expansion of the arc-tangent function. However, what is most impressive is that he also gave a correction term R_{n} for the error after computing the sum up to n terms, namely:

R_{n} = (−1)^{n} / (4n), or
R_{n} = (−1)^{n}⋅n / (4n^{2} + 1), or
R_{n} = (−1)^{n}⋅(n^{2} + 1) / (4n^{3} + 5n),

where the third correction leads to highly accurate computations of π.

It has long been speculated how Madhava found these correction terms. They are the first three convergents of a finite continued fraction, which, when combined with the original Madhava's series evaluated to n terms, yields about 3n/2 correct digits:

$$\frac{\pi}{4} \approx 1 - \frac{1}{3} + \frac{1}{5} - \frac{1}{7} + \cdots + \frac{(-1)^{n-1}}{2n - 1} + \cfrac{(-1)^n}{4n + \cfrac{1^2}{n + \cfrac{2^2}{4n + \cfrac{3^2}{n + \cfrac{4^2}{\dots + \cfrac{\dots}{\dots + \cfrac{n^2}{n[4 - 3(n \bmod 2)]}}}}}}}.$$

The absolute value of the correction term in next higher order is

|R_{n}| = (4n^{3} + 13n) / (16n^{4} + 56n^{2} + 9).

He also gave a more rapidly converging series by transforming the original infinite series of π, obtaining the infinite series

$$\pi = \sqrt{12}\left(1 - \frac{1}{3 \cdot 3} + \frac{1}{5 \cdot 3^2} - \frac{1}{7 \cdot 3^3} + \cdots\right).$$

By using the first 21 terms to compute an approximation of π, he obtains a value correct to 11 decimal places (3.14159265359). The value of 3.1415926535898, correct to 13 decimals, is sometimes attributed to Madhava, but may be due to one of his followers. These were the most accurate approximations of π given since the 5th century (see History of numerical approximations of π).

The text Sadratnamala appears to give the astonishingly accurate value of π = 3.14159265358979324 (correct to 17 decimal places). Based on this, R. Gupta has suggested that this text was also composed by Madhava.

Madhava also carried out investigations into other series for arc lengths and the associated approximations to rational fractions of π.

=== Calculus ===
Madhava developed the power series expansion for some trigonometry functions which were further developed by his successors at the Kerala school of astronomy and mathematics. (Certain ideas of calculus were known to earlier mathematicians.) Madhava also extended some results found in earlier works, including those of Bhāskara II. However, they did not combine many differing ideas under the two unifying themes of the derivative and the integral, show the connection between the two, or turn calculus into the powerful problem-solving tool we have today.

=== Lagnaprakarana ===
Lagnaprakarana (लग्नप्रकरण) is an astronomical treatise that deals with the calculation of the ascendant (lagna) and the planetary positions. Palm-leaf manuscripts of the work have been catalogued and preserved at research archives in Kerala.

== Madhava's works ==
K. V. Sarma has identified Madhava as the author of the following works:

1. Golavada
2. Madhyamanayanaprakara
3. Mahajyanayanaprakara (Method of Computing Great Sines)
4. Lagnaprakarana (लग्नप्रकरण)
5. Venvaroha (वेण्वारोह)
6. Sphuṭacandrāpti (स्फुटचन्द्राप्ति)
7. Aganita-grahacara (अगणित-ग्रहचार)
8. Chandravakyani (चन्द्रवाक्यानि) (Table of Moon-mnemonics)

== Kerala School of Astronomy and Mathematics ==
The Kerala school of astronomy and mathematics, founded by Madhava, flourished between the 14th and 16th centuries, and included among its members Parameshvara, Neelakanta Somayaji, Jyeshtadeva, Achyuta Pisharati, Melpathur Narayana Bhattathiri and Achyuta Panikkar. The group is known for series expansion of three trigonometric functions of sine, cosine and arctan and proofs of their results where later given in the Yuktibhasa. The group also did much other work in astronomy: more pages are devoted to astronomical computations than purely mathematical results.

== Influence ==
Madhava has been called "the greatest mathematician-astronomer of medieval India", some of his discoveries in this field show him to have possessed extraordinary intuition". O'Connor and Robertson state that a fair assessment of Madhava is that he took the decisive step towards modern classical analysis.

=== Possible propagation to Europe ===
The Kerala school was well known in the 15th and 16th centuries, in the period of the first contact with European navigators in the Malabar Coast. At the time, the port of Muziris, near Sangamagrama, was a major center for maritime trade, and a number of Jesuit missionaries and traders were active in this region. Given the fame of the Kerala school, and the interest shown by some of the Jesuit groups during this period in local scholarship, some scholars, including G. Joseph of the U. Manchester have suggested that the writings of the Kerala school may have also been transmitted to Europe around this time, which was still about a century before Newton. However, there is no direct evidence by way of relevant manuscripts that such a transmission actually took place. According to David Bressoud, "there is no evidence that the Indian work of series was known beyond India, or even outside of Kerala, until the nineteenth century."

== See also ==
- Madhava Observatory
- Madhava's sine table
- Madhava series
- Madhava's correction term
- Venvaroha
- Yuktibhāṣā
- Kerala school of astronomy and mathematics
- List of astronomers and mathematicians of the Kerala school
- List of Indian mathematicians
- Indian mathematics
- History of calculus
