= Conda, Angola =

Conda
- Municipality and town
- Location in Angola
- Coordinates: 11°10′S 14°30′E
- Country: Angola
- Province: Cuanza Sul Province

Population (2014 Census)
  - Municipality and town: 89,479
  - Urban: 21,260
- Time zone: UTC+1 (WAT)
- Climate: Aw

Conda is a town and municipality in Cuanza Sul Province in Angola. The municipality had a population of 89,479 in 2014.
