= Amboiva =

- commune and town
- Location in Angola
- Coordinates: 11°33′S 14°44′E
- Country: Angola
- Province: Cuanza Sul
- Municipality: Seles
- Elevation: 4,081 ft (1,244 m)
- Time zone: UTC+1 (WAT)

Amboiva is a town and commune in the municipality of Seles, province of Cuanza Sul, Angola. It is roughly 55 kilometres east of Uku and 80 kilometres southeast of Gabela. It lies at an altitude of 1244 metres.

The People's Armed Forces for the Liberation of Angola (FAPLA) and Cuban troops took the town on 1 February 1976 during the Angolan Civil War.
