= Sangham =

Sangham may refer to:

- Sangham (1954 film), an Indian Telugu-language film
- Sangham (1988 film), an Indian Malayalam-language film

== See also ==
- Sangam (disambiguation)
