= Rio Quicombo =

River in Angola

Coordinates: 11°26′S 14°00′E

Rio Cubal
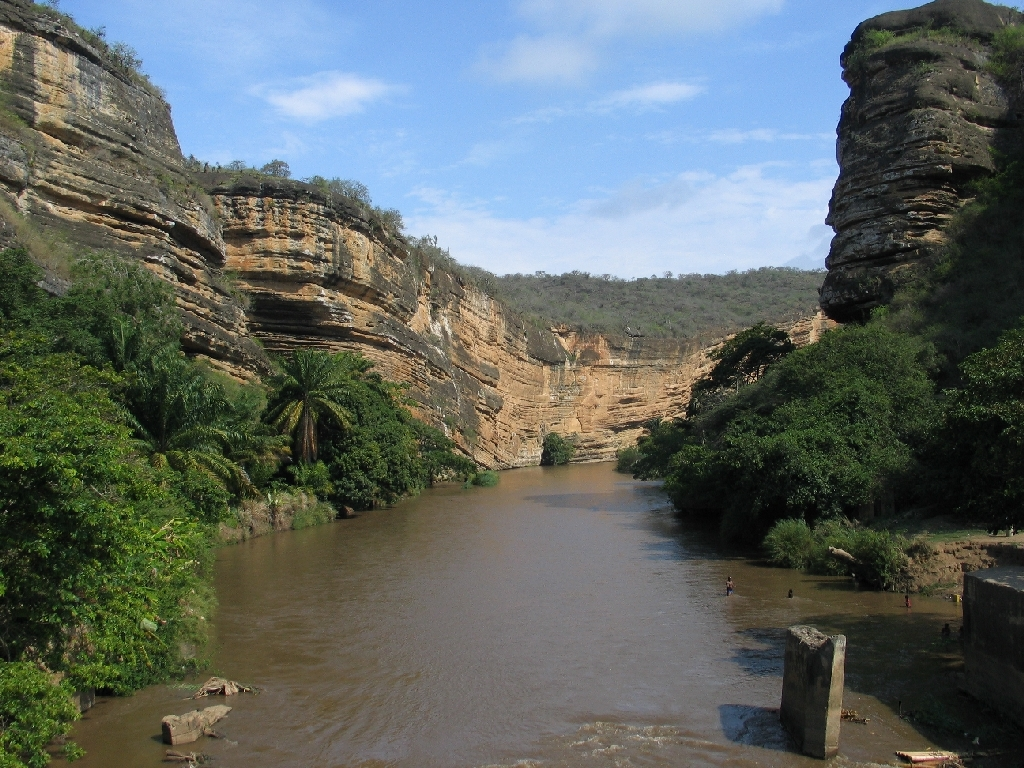

Location
- Country: Angola

Physical characteristics
- Source
  - location: [Cuanza Sul]
- Mouth
  - elevation: 0 m (0 ft)

The Rio Cubal is a river south of Sumbe, Angola and just north of Kikombo in Cuanza Sul Province, Angola. Sandstone cliff faces on both sides of Rio Quicombo. Located at the bridge crossing the river.
