= Makaranda =

Hindu astronomer, calendrist and astrologer

Makaranda or Makarandācārya or Makaranda Anandakanda (fl. 1438-1478) was an astronomer, calendrist, and Hindu astrologer who lived in Kāśī (Varanasi) and wrote an astronomical work called the Makaranda sāriṇī (मकरन्द सारिणी) which included tables for the calculation of the planetary movements.

Makaranda followed the Saurapaksa tradition or school of astronomy (related to the Saura calendar). The tables in the work make use of a sexagesimal system for the units of time. The tables were used widely in Bihar and Bengal and were the basis for at least twenty later commentaries, as noted by David Pingree and Kim Plofker.
