= Condé, Angola =

Condé
- Commune
- Location in Angola
- Coordinates: 10°50′43″S 14°40′33″E
- Country: Angola
- Province: Cuanza Sul
- Time zone: UTC+1 (WAT)
- Climate: Aw

Condé is a town and commune of Angola, located in the province of Cuanza Sul.

== See also ==
- Communes of Angola
