= Ngangula =

- Commune
- Country: Angola
- Province: Cuanza Sul
- Time zone: UTC+1 (WAT)
- Climate: Aw

Ngangula is a town and commune of Angola, located in the province of Cuanza Sul.

== See also ==
- Communes of Angola
