= Ram Karan Sharma =

20th century poet (1927-2018)

Ram Karan Sharma (1927 – 18 December 2018) was a Sanskrit poet and scholar. He was born in 1927, in Shivapur in the Saran district of Bihar.

== Life ==
He was awarded an MA in Sanskrit and Hindi from Patna University as well as Sahityacharya, Vyakarana Shastri and Vedanta Shastri degrees. He earned a PhD in Linguistics from the University of California, Berkeley, under the guidance of Murray B. Emeneau. Sharma wrote in both Sanskrit and English. Apart from his literary works he has also translated and edited books on Indian medicine, epics, and Puranas. He also contributed research papers in various seminars, journals and books in the field of Indology.

== Death ==
He died on 18 December 2018 in India.

== Awards and honours ==
He received awards including the Sahitya Akademi Award for Sanskrit in 1989, the Bharatiya Bhasha Parishad Award in 1989, the Delhi Sanskrit Academy Award, and the prestigious Presidential Award. He received the 2005 Krishna Kanta Handique Memorial Award, given in recognition of his contributions to promote the cause of Sanskrit language and literature. In 2004, he was given Vachaspati Puraskar by the K. K. Birla Foundation to honour writers for their work in Sanskrit during the previous ten years for his poetic work Gaganvani.

He was a fellow of the Royal Asiatic Society and Member of the American Oriental Society.

He was vice chancellor of Kameshwar Singh Darbhanga Sanskrit University, Darbhanga, from 1974–1980 and also held the same position at Sampurnanand Sanskrit University, Varanasi, from 1984-1985. He has held visiting professorships at the University of California, Berkeley, the University of Chicago, Columbia University, and the University of Pennsylvania.

== Select bibliography ==
=== Sanskrit Poetry ===
- Sandhya
- Patheyasatakam
- Vina
- Kavita
- "sarvamsaha"

=== Sanskrit novels ===
- Rayisah
- Sima

=== Works in English ===
- Elements of Poetry in the Mahabharata
- Anthology of Medieval Sanskrit Literature (included in volume one of Paniker's Anthology of Medieval Indian Literature)
- Researches in Indian and Buddhist Philosophy: Essays in Honour of Professor Alex Wayman

=== Other major works ===
- Śivasahasranāmāṣṭakam
- Sivasukiyam
- Gaganavani
- Caraka Samhita
- Rejuvenative Healthcare in Ayurveda
- Sarvamangala
- Sumanomala
- Dipika
- Bhagavad Gita

=== Edited works ===
- Gaṇeśa Purāṇa

== Works about him ==
- Rangnath, S. (1997). Poetry of Dr. Ram Karan Sharma. Pratibha Prakashan. ISBN 978-81-85268-68-2.

== See also ==
- List of Indian writers
- Mithila Vishwavidyalaya Panchang
