= Madhava Observatory =

Observatory set up University of Calicut

Coordinates: 11°08′20″N 75°53′18″E

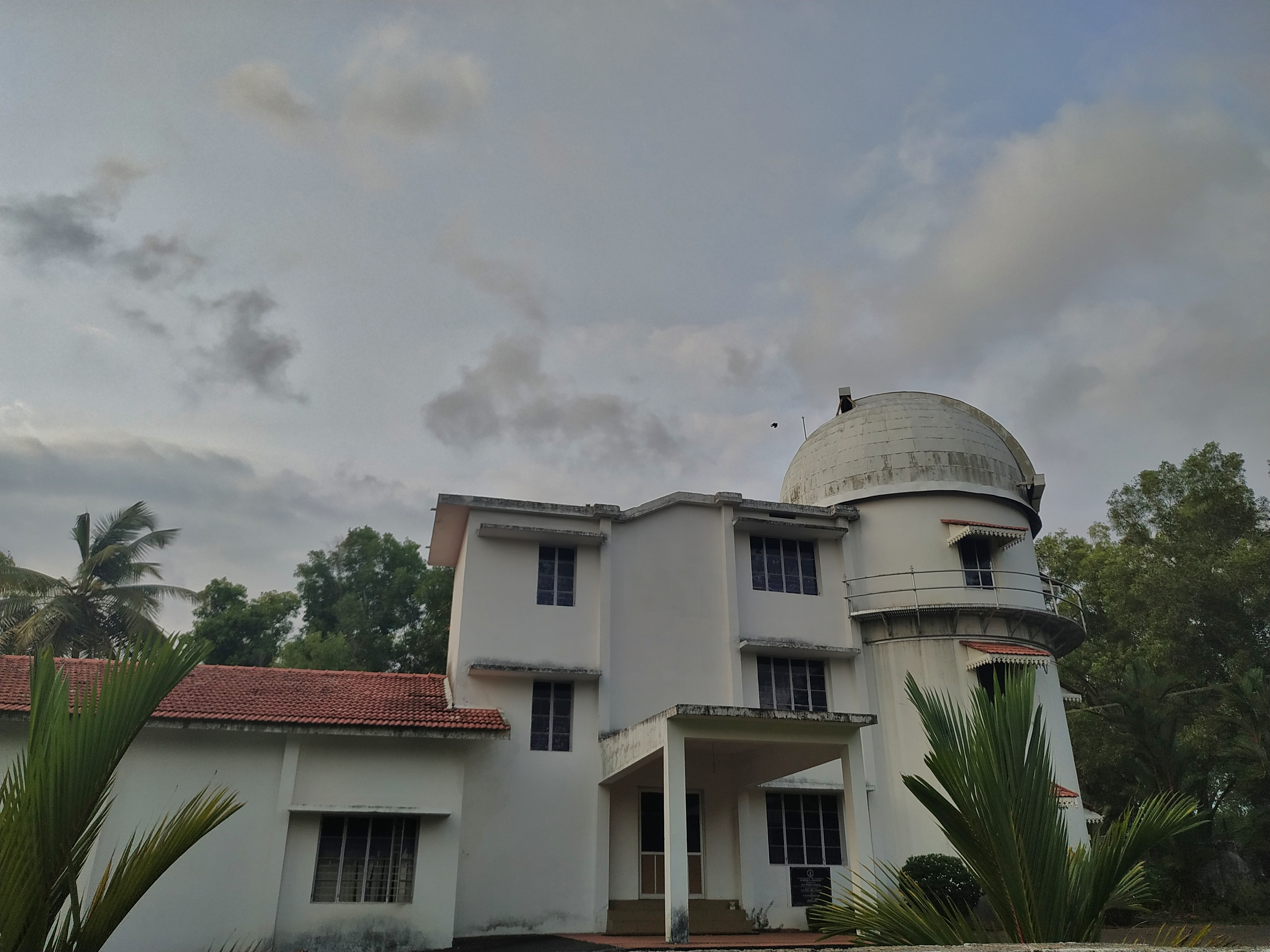
Madhava Observatory, University of Calicut

Madhava Observatory is an observatory set up by the University of Calicut in 2005 in association with the Indian Institute of Astrophysics (IIA), Bangalore. It is the largest observatory at the university level in India. The 6.6-metre (22 ft) hemispherical dome has a 1.75-metre (5.7 ft) slit opening, a wheel assembly and a 14-inch Meade (Cassegrain) telescope. The observatory is used by the faculty and staff of the university for study and research purposes. The observatory has also an 18-inch NGT reflector telescope gifted by IIAP, Bangalore, a dedicated computer facility for data collection and analysis.

The observatory is named after Madhava of Sangamagrama (c. 1340 – c. 1425), who is considered one of the greatest mathematician-astronomers of the Middle Ages and was the founder of the Kerala school of astronomy and mathematics.
