= Katha Sangama =

Katha Sangama (transl. Confluence of tales) may refer to:

- Katha Sangama (1976 film), an Indian Kannada-language anthology film
- Katha Sangama (2019 film), an Indian Kannada-language anthology film

== See also ==
- Katha (disambiguation)
- Sangama (disambiguation)
