= Waco Kungo Airport =

Airport in Cuanza Sul, Angola

Waku Kungo Airport
- IATA: CEO; ICAO: FNWK

Summary
- Airport type: Public
- Serves: Waku-Kungo
- Location: Cela
- Elevation AMSL: 4,324 ft / 1,318 m
- Coordinates: 11°25′35″S 15°06′05″E

Map
- Location of airport in Angola

Runways
Direction	Length		Surface
Direction	m	ft	Surface
07/25	2,005	6,578	Asphalt
- Source: GCM Landings.com Google Maps

Waku Kungo Airport (IATA: CEO, ICAO: FNWK) is an airport serving Waku-Kungo in Cuanza Sul Province, Angola. The runway is 6.5 kilometres (4.0 mi) south of Waku-Kungo, near the village of Cela.

The Wako Kungu non-directional beacon (Ident: CE) is located on the field.

== See also ==
- List of airports in Angola
- Transport in Angola
