= Quilenda =

- Municipality and town
- Location in Angola
- Coordinates: 10°38′S 14°20′E
- Country: Angola
- Province: Cuanza Sul Province

Population (2014 Census)
  - Municipality and town: 97,648
  - Urban: 13,726
- Time zone: UTC+1 (WAT)
- Climate: Aw

Quilenda is a town and municipality in Cuanza Sul Province in Angola. The municipality had a population of 97,648 in 2014.
