= Bakhshali =

Bakhshali Mardan Pakistan
- Bakhshali Mardan Pakistan
- Location within Khyber Pakhtunkhwa Location within Pakistan
- Coordinates: 34°17′05″N 72°09′00″E
- Country: Pakistan
- Province: Khyber-Pakhtunkhwa
- District: Mardan

Government
  - Nazim: Qazi Bashir
- Time zone: UTC+5 (PST)

Bakhshali (Urdu: بخشالی) is a village and union council in Mardan District, Khyber-Pakhtunkhwa, Pakistan. It is located at 34°17'0N 72°9'0E and has an altitude of 307 metres (1010 feet).

== History ==
The village is notable for being the location of what is now known as the Bakhshali manuscript. This is an ancient mathematical work written on birch bark and is the oldest surviving document in South Asia of Indian mathematics. It was discovered in 1881 during British rule by the tenant of a local police inspector. The manuscript was discovered while the tenant was digging in an abandoned building.

== See also ==
- Baghdada
