= Nepal Dalit Sangh =

Dalit wing of political Party

- नेपाल दलित संघ
- Abbreviation: NDS
- Founded: 27 November 1997; 28 years ago
- Established: 16 February 1998; 28 years ago
- Founders: Man Bahadur Bishwakarma; Ratna Bahadur Bishwakarma; Dal Singh Kami; Ganesh Pariyar; Padma Singh Bishwakarma; Bijul Kumar Bishwakarma
- Type: Political association
- Legal status: Active
- Headquarters: Kathmandu, Nepal
- Location: Sanepa, Lalitpur, B.P. Smritinagar
- Region served: Nepal
- Founder President: Man Bahadur Bishwakarma
- President: Bipendra Ramudamu
- Parent organization: Nepali Congress
- Volunteers: All the Position and the cadets of the organization are Volunteers.

Nepal Dalit Sangh (Nepali: नेपाल दलित संघ, lit. 'Nepal Dalit Association'; abbr. NDS) is a Nepalese Dalit movement linked to the Nepali Congress. The organization emerged from initiatives by Dalit leaders associated with the Nepali Congress, including Bijul Bishwakarma, Ganesh Pariyar, and Dal Singh Kami, and was formally established as a sister organization of the party on 27 November 1997.

== History ==
The origins of Nepal Dalit Sangh can be traced to the early 1990s, when Bijul Bishwakarma, Ganesh Pariyar, Dal Singh Kami and other leaders established a Dalit organization aligned with the Nepali Congress. Sources identify Ratna Bahadur Bishwakarma, Dal Singh Kami, Ganesh Pariyar, Padma Singh Bishwakarma, Bijul Kumar Bishwakarma and Man Bahadur Bishwakarma among the organization's founding leaders. Prior to adopting the name Nepal Dalit Sangh, the organization was known as Nepal Bikaswonmukh Samaj Sangh. In 2054 B.S. (1997), it was formally recognized as a sister organization of the Nepali Congress. An ad hoc committee headed by Man Bahadur Bishwakarma was constituted on 27 November 1997 (12 Mangsir 2054 B.S.), and the organization's statute was subsequently approved by the party, granting it official recognition.

=== Split ===
When the Nepali Congress was divided and the Nepali Congress (Democratic) was formed, a splinter Nepal Dalit Sangh (Prajatantrik) was formed as the NC(D) Dalit wing by ratifying the Committee of Ratna Bahadur Bishwakarma, Which was already formed as alternative parallel central committee by agitating with organizing committee in Biratnagar 2nd Convention of Nepal dalit Sangh.

=== Reunification ===
With the reunification of NC and NC(D) the NDS and NDS(P) were also reunified, and in August 2007 the Nepali Congress appointed a 39-member ad hoc committee of NDS, with Khadga Bahadur Basyal (Sarki) as president and Jeevan Pariyar as general secretary.

2012 AD Nepal Dalit Sangh has done its 4th national convention and Mr. Min Bahadur Bishwakarma has been elected as president. Nepal Dalit Sangh NDS is one of the leading democratic Organization for Dalit community of Nepal. NDs has a 75 members in body of central committee. Dipak Soni was a secretary in central committee of Nepal Dalit sangh till 2021, from January 2022, Mr. Soni is appointed as acting General secretary and Mr. Bhiusen Damai has been newly nominated as secretary for remaining tenure of NDA central committee. rest of two secretaries are MS. Devika Nepali and Mr. Dharmendra Paswan are also representing to women and madheshi dalit group in the same committee respectively.
