= Cassongue =

- Municipality and town
- Location in Angola
- Coordinates: 11°50′S 15°0′E
- Country: Angola
- Province: Cuanza Sul Province

Population (2014 Census)
  - Total: 151,917
- Time zone: UTC+1 (WAT)
- Climate: Aw

Cassongue (Portuguese spelling) or Kasonge (Bantu spelling) is a town and municipality in Cuanza Sul Province in Angola. The municipality had a population of 151,917 in 2014.
