= Nepal Dalit Sangh (Prajatantrik) =

Nepal Dalit Sangh (Prajatantrik) (Nepali: नेपाल दलित संघ (प्रजातान्त्रिक)) was a Nepalese Dalit movement linked to the Nepali Congress (Democratic). NDS(P) was formed through a split away from the Nepal Dalit Sangh. Shambuhajara Paswan was the general secretary of NSD(P).

With the reunification of NC and NC(D) in 2007, the NDS and NDS(P) were also reunified.
