= Sangha Department (Burkina Faso) =

Coordinates: 11°10′50″N 0°09′34″E

Sangha
- Department
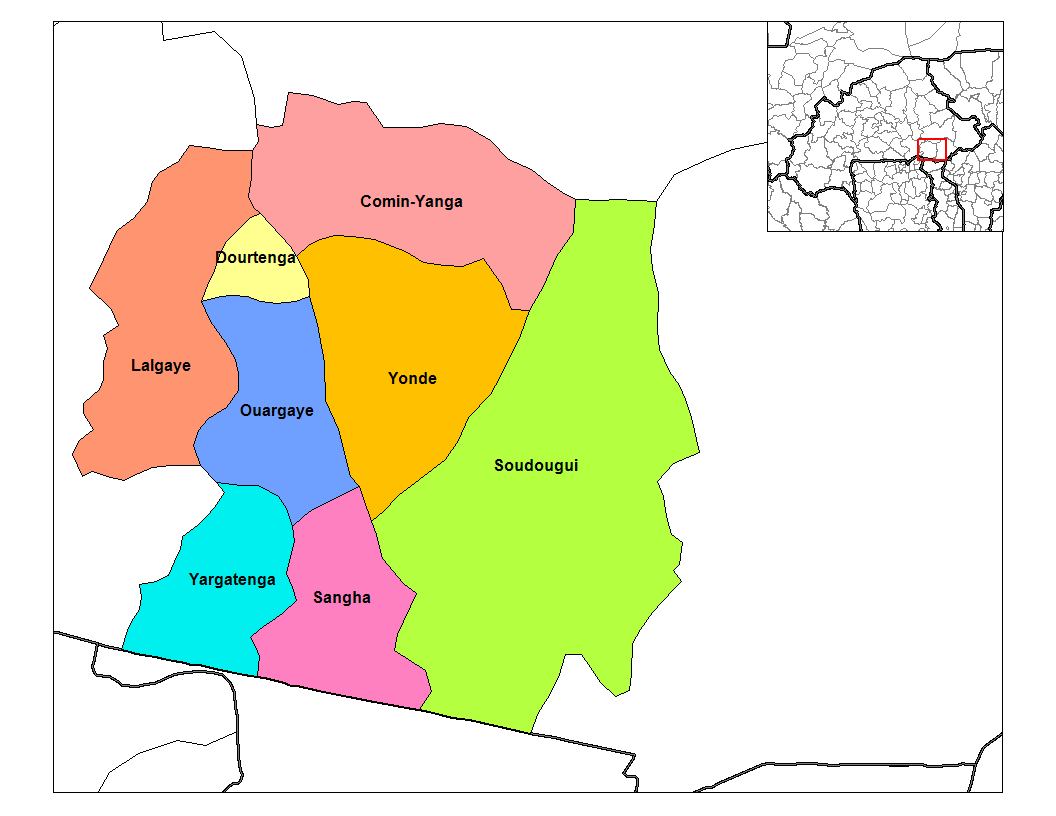
- Sangha Department (Burkina Faso) location in the province
- Country: Burkina Faso
- Province: Koulpélogo Province

Area
  - Total: 173 sq mi (447 km^{2})

Population (2019 census)
  - Total: 54,623
  - Density: 316/sq mi (122/km^{2})
- Time zone: UTC+0 (GMT 0)

See also Sangha (disambiguation).

Sangha is a department or commune of Koulpélogo Province in eastern Burkina Faso. Its capital is the town of Sangha. According to the 2019 census the department has a total population of 54,623.

== Towns and villages ==
- Sangha (8,536 inhabitants) (capital)
- Biguimnoghin (651 inhabitants)
- Dabodin (633 inhabitants)
- Daboulga (700 inhabitants)
- Dagomkom (1,828 inhabitants)
- Diougo (1,435 inhabitants)
- Ganzaga (636 inhabitants)
- Goghin, Koulpélogo (1,030 inhabitants)
- Gouadiga (1,028 inhabitants)
- Idani (7,000 inhabitants)
- Kandoure (515 inhabitants)
- Kaongo (1,095 inhabitants)
- Kombilga (2,783 inhabitants)
- Koyenga (1,078 inhabitants)
- Longo (2,546 inhabitants)
- Naba-Dabogo (2,516 inhabitants)
- Ouedogo (1,293 inhabitants)
- Sangha-Peulh (1,408 inhabitants)
- Sangha-Yarcé (1,446 inhabitants)
- Sankanse (1,104 inhabitants)
- Tabe (1,343 inhabitants)
- Tampaologo (665 inhabitants)
- Tankoaga (2,864 inhabitants)
- Taram-Noaga (4,511 inhabitants)
- Yourga (1,296 inhabitants)
- Yourkoudghin (982 inhabitants)
