= Atoma =

Atoma may refer to:

- Atoma (album), a 2016 album by Dark Tranquillity
- Atoma, an enemy planet in the 1951 film Captain Video: Master of the Stratosphere
- Atoma, a private brand of Proxim pharmacies in Quebec
- atoma (plural of Greek atomon) in Atomism, meaning “indivisible”, a term coined by Democritus
- ATOMA, an Afghanistani telecommunications company owned by M1 Group
- Atoma, a Belgian manufacturer of the disc-binding notebook system
