= Tafi Atome Monkey Sanctuary =

Monkey Sanctuary in Ghana

- Sanctuaire des singes de Tafi Atome
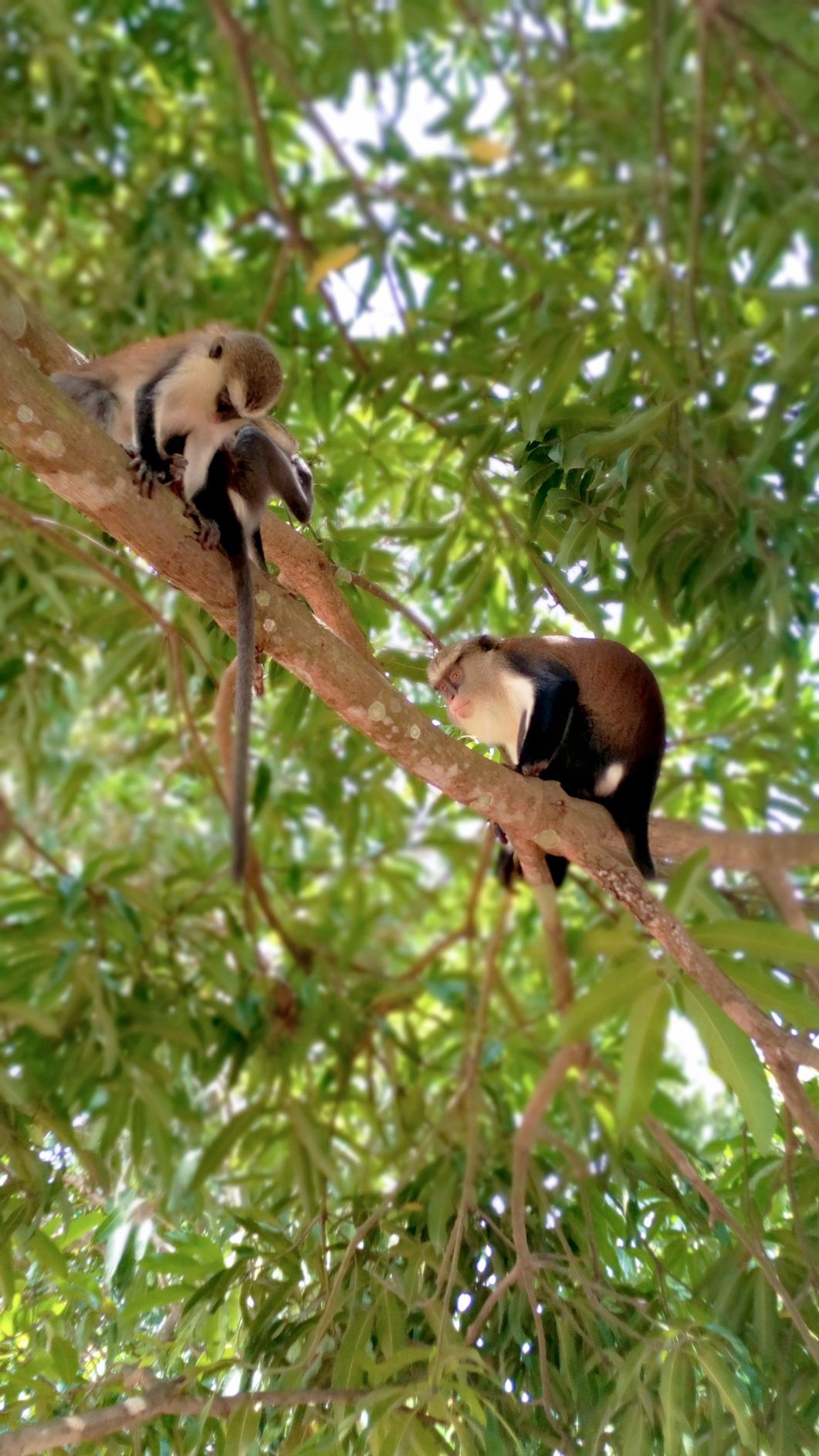
- Mona monkeys in Tafi Atome Monkey Sanctuary
- Location: Tafi Atome, Volta region, Ghana
- Nearest city: Kpando
- Established: 1993

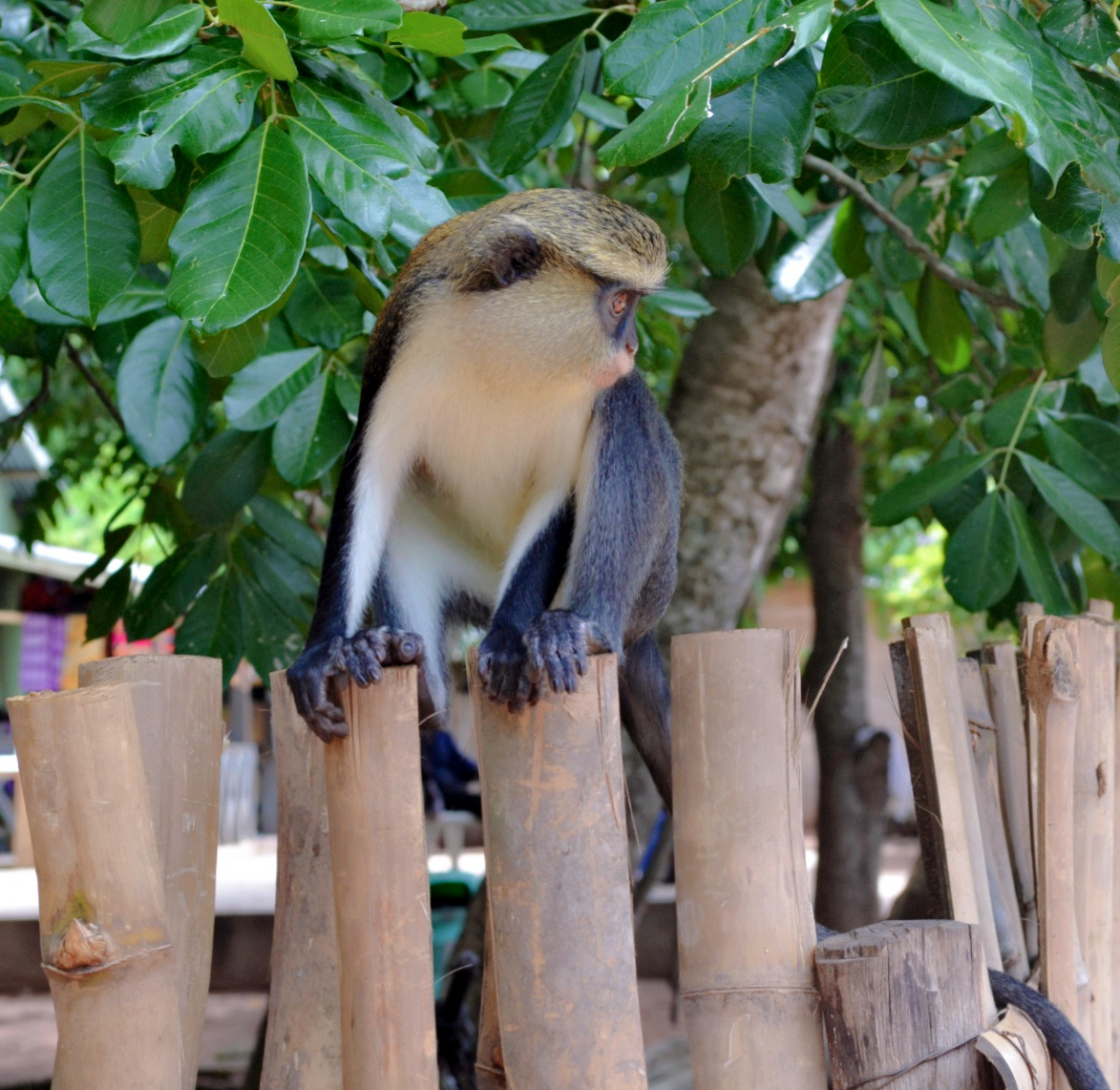
A monkey at the sanctuary

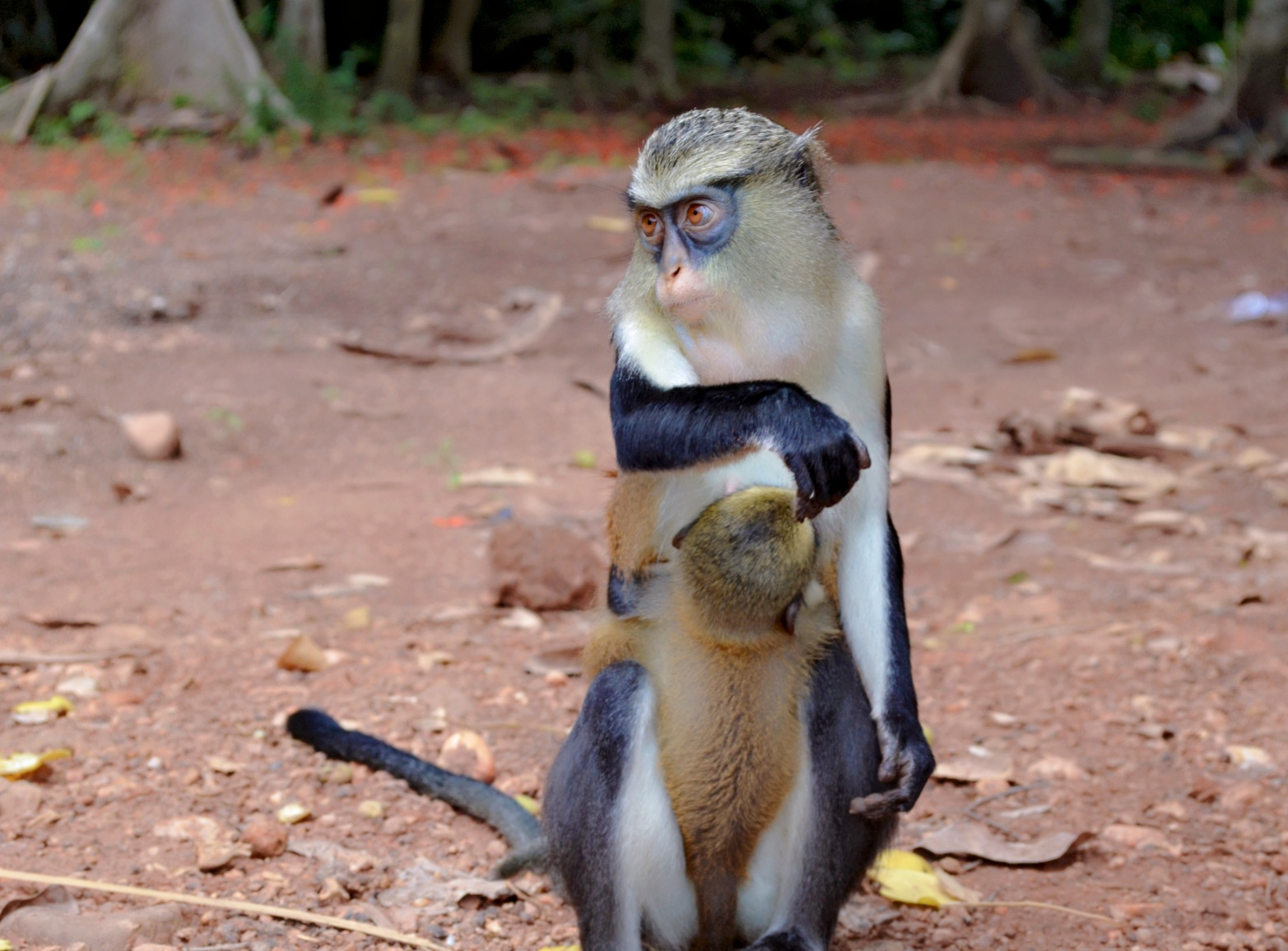
Mona monkeys

Tafi Atome Monkey Sanctuary is a traditional sacred grove conservation established in 1993 under the direction of a Peace Corps volunteer as a community-based ecotourism project. Tafi Atome is the home of mona and patas monkeys.

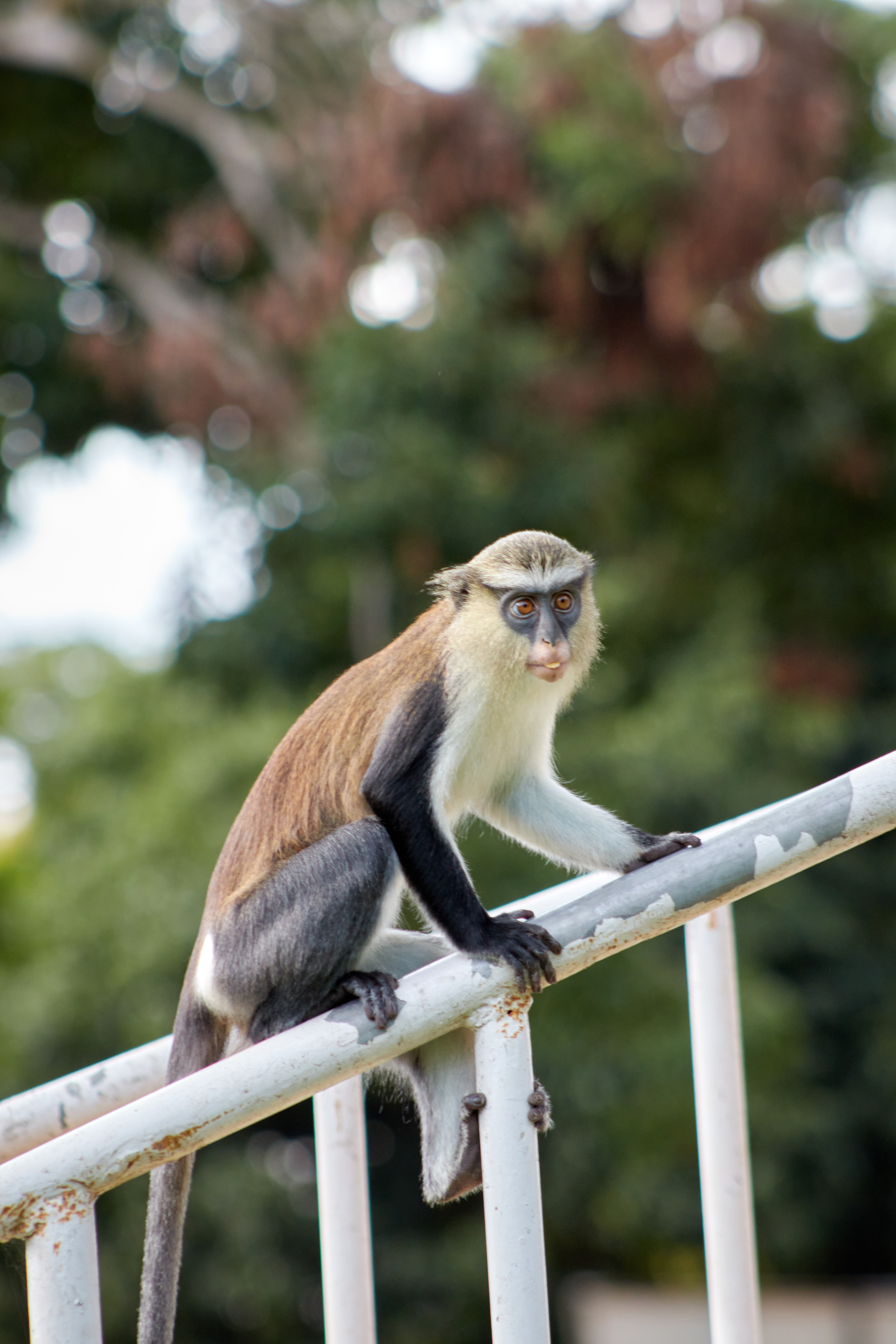
A monkey at the Tafi Atome Monkey Sanctuary in the Volta Region of Ghana

== Location ==
The sanctuary is located about 230 kilometers Northeast of the capital Accra and 43 kilometers south of Hohoe in the Volta region of Ghana.

== History ==
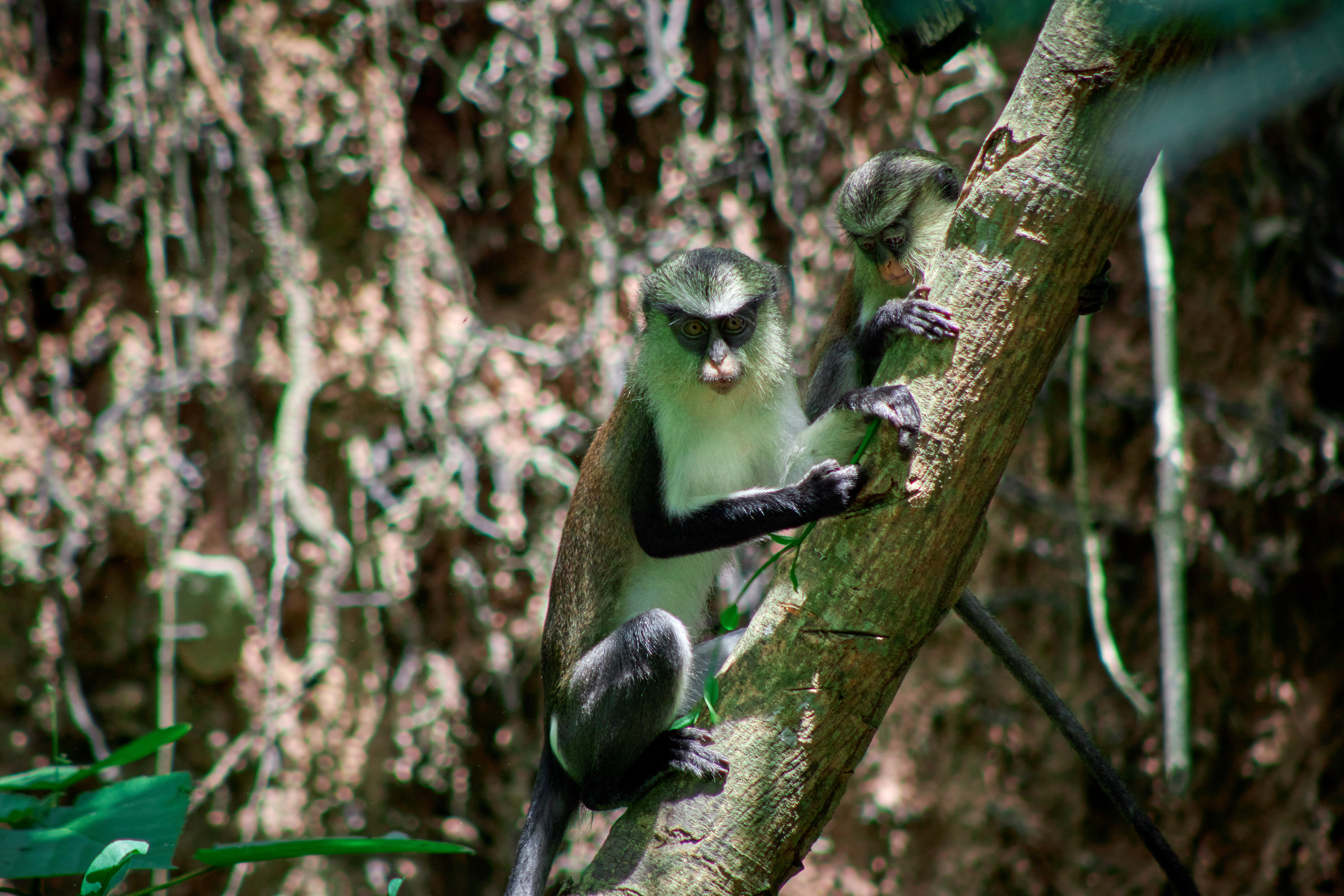
A monkey specie in the Tafi Atome Monkey Sanctuary in the Volta Region of Ghana

For the past two centuries, the monkeys are found living in the tropical forest around the small village of Tafi-Atome and have been sacred because it was believed they were messengers from the gods. In 1996, the village began broader efforts to protect their forest and monkeys, as well as to offer tours for visitors. The sanctuary was created by a coalition of villagers, public institutions and NGO. As a result of these efforts, the monkey population has increased, and the forest with its many species of birds and butterflies has been preserved.

== Upgrade of facilities ==
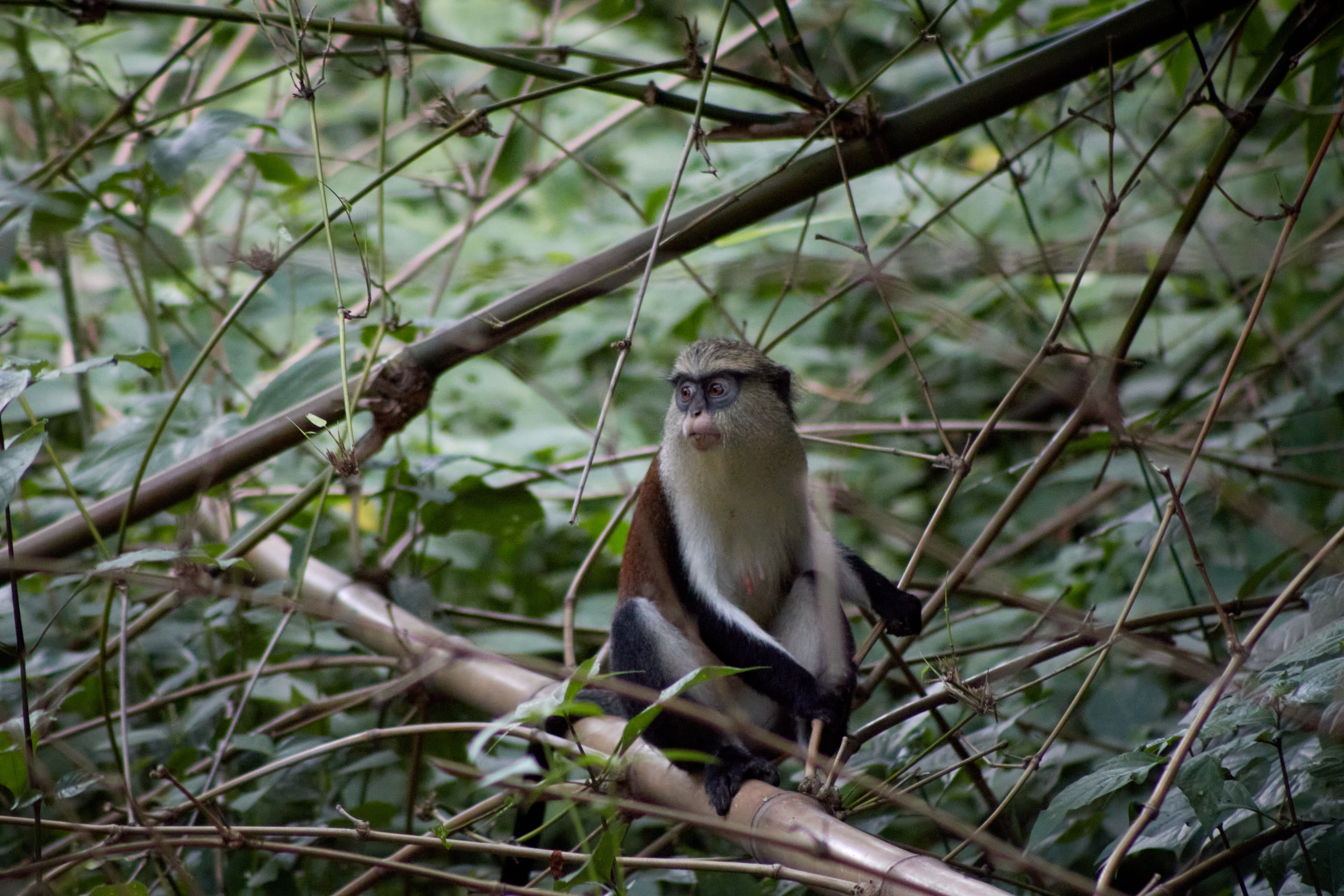
A monkey specie in the Tafi Atome Monkey Sanctuary located in the Volta Region of Ghana

In November 2020, an upgrade which included a new tourist reception area, a modern seven-seater washroom, three pavilions for visitors, a fence of wire mesh and bamboo around the site, painting of the edifices and structures, a car park and paved grounds was commissioned.

== Conservation tools ==
Mention the conservation tools or approaches that have been used or developed to support the sacred natural sites. This can be tools or methods used for inventory or monitoring of plants and animals or for developing community capacity and strengthening of cultural values of the site and its people. The use of planning tools and guidelines should also be mentioned, for example the IUCN UNESCO Sacred Natural Site Guidelines for Protected Area Manager by Wild and McLeod.
