= Sangamagrama =

- Village
- Country: India
- State: Kerala
- District: Thrissur

Languages
  - Official: Malayalam, English
- Time zone: UTC+5:30 (IST)
- Vehicle registration: KL-

Sangamagrama is a town in medieval Kerala believed to be the Brahminical Grama of Irinjalakuda which includes parts of Irinjalakuda Municipality, Aloor, Muriyad and Velookara Panchayaths, Thrissur District. It is associated with the noted mathematician Madhava of Sangamagrama, founder of the Kerala school of astronomy and mathematics.

The town is known for the Koodalmanikyam temple.

The town was also home of Narayan Misra who was the author of the Ancient Text Vādhūla Gṛhyāgamavṛttirahasyam.
