= Sangamam =

Sangamam may refer to:

- Sangamam (1977 film), 1977 Malayalam film, directed by Hariharan
- Sangamam (1999 film), 1999 Tamil romantic musical dance film co written and directed by Suresh Krissna
- Sangamam (2008 film), 2008 Telugu romantic drama film directed by Rasool Ellore
