= Seles, Angola =

Seles
- Municipality
- Location in Angola
- Coordinates: 11°24′17″S 14°18′2″E
- Country: Angola
- Province: Cuanza Sul Province

Population (2024)
  - Municipality: 191,349
  - Urban: 47,421
  - Commune: 114,760
- Time zone: UTC+1 (WAT)

Seles is a town and municipality in Cuanza Sul Province in Angola.

The municipality had a population of 187,127 in 2014. It is on the Atlantic coast, roughly 55 kilometres west by road from Amboiva and 78 kilometres east by road from Sumbe.

Until 1975, Seles was called Vila Nova do Seles or Vila do Seles. Part of the town is also known as Uku.
