= Kissanga Kungo =

- Commune
- Country: Angola
- Province: Cuanza Sul

Area
  - Total: 520 sq mi (1,350 km^{2})

Population (2014)
  - Total: 46,563
  - Density: 89.3/sq mi (34.5/km^{2})
- Time zone: UTC+1 (WAT)
- Climate: Aw

Kissanga Kungo is a commune of Angola, located in the province of Cuanza Sul.

== See also ==
- Communes of Angola
