= Sanga, Angola =

Sanga
- Commune
- Country: Angola
- Province: Cuanza Sul

Area
  - Total: 790 sq mi (2,040 km^{2})

Population
  - Total: 28,364
  - Density: 36.0/sq mi (13.9/km^{2})
- Time zone: UTC+1 (WAT)
- Climate: Aw

Sanga is a commune of Angola, located in the province of Cuanza Sul.

== See also ==
- Communes of Angola
