= Ebo, Angola =

Ebo
- Municipality and town
- Location in Angola
- Coordinates: 11°0′S 14°40′E
- Country: Angola
- Province: Cuanza Sul Province

Population (2014 Census)
  - Municipality and town: 165,129
  - Urban: 10,000
- Time zone: UTC+1 (WAT)
- Climate: Aw

Ebo, Angola is a town and municipality in Cuanza Sul Province in Angola. The municipality had a population of 165,129 in 2014.
