= Uaco Cungo =

Uaco Cungo Santa Coma
- Commune and town
- Waku-Kungo
- Location within Angola
- Coordinates: 11°21′30″S 15°07′10″E
- Country: Angola
- Province: Cuanza Sul
- Municipality: Cela

Area
  - Total: 1,430 km^{2} (550 sq mi)
- Elevation: 1,475 m (4,839 ft)

Population (2014)
  - Total: 150,593
  - Density: 105/km^{2} (273/sq mi)
- Climate: Cwb

Uaco Cungo (before 1975 Santa Comba, also Waco Kungo or Cela) is a town, with a population of 90,000 (2014), and a commune located in Cela Municipality in the Cuanza Sul Province in Angola. The population of the commune is 150,593 (2014). The town is served by Waco Kungo Airport.

== History ==
On August 6, 1975, the civil war between UNITA, FNLA and MPLA forced local residents to leave their homes causing a total collapse of infrastructure that lasted over 30 years while the cold war persisted. Most of the residents of Waku Kungo, then Santa Comba, were rescued by the International Red Cross and air-lifted to Portugal. It was the site of a 1994 bombing of a school, resulting in the death of 89 children.
