= Cuanza Sul Province =

Province of Angola

Coordinates: 10°38′S 14°30′E

Cuanza Sul
- Province
- Cuanza Sul, province of Angola
- Country: Angola
- Capital: Sumbe

Government
  - Governor: Narciso Damasio dos Santos Benedito
  - Vice-Governor for the Political, Economic and Social Sector: Emilia Cambundo Tchinawalile Antonio Salles Camuhoto
  - Vice-Governor for Technical Services and Infrastructures: Heitor Dario de Jose Henriques Alfredo

Area
  - Total: 55,600 km^{2} (21,500 sq mi)

Population (2014 census)
  - Total: 1,881,873
  - Density: 33.8/km^{2} (87.7/sq mi)
- ISO 3166 code: AO-CUS
- HDI (2018): 0.445 low · 18th
- Website: www.kwanzasul.gov.ao

Cuanza Sul Province ("South Cuanza"; Umbundu: Kwanza Kombuelo Volupale) is a province of Angola. It has an area of 55,660 square kilometres (21,490 sq mi) and a population of 1,881,873. Sumbe is the capital of the province. Dom Francisco Inocêncio de Sousa Coutinho founded the province in 1769 as Novo Redondo ("New Redondo").

== History ==
The province was badly affected during the Angolan Civil War (1975–2002). A large number of civilians were killed in the clashes between National Union for the Total Independence of Angola (UNITA) and Angolan Armed Forces (FAA). Coffee plantations and fields were destroyed. Frequent attacks forced people to leave their municipalities. UNITA had opened its central front in the province. Around 116,000 displaced people were living in camps. The majority of them were from the rural areas and the densely populated plateau regions. On 17 December 2000, the UNITA combatants killed 31 FAA soldiers and looted vehicles, arms and about 20,000 litres of diesel in Quibala. In April 2001 they attacked FAA outposts and captured firearms.

Landmines laid during the civil war are still present and contracts to clear them were given to different organisations. They are still present in several areas. The province has a high density of landmines. In 2008 the province's Maria Restino Manuel was declared the Internet winner of Miss Landmine 2008. She had secured 29% of the online votes.

== Geography ==
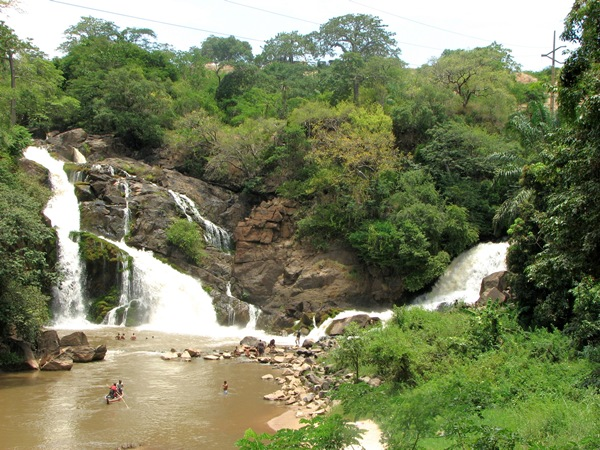
Cachoeiras do Binda

Kibalas, N'goias, Musseles, Mussumbas and Bailundos are the major ethnic groups in the province. The Kimbundu language is most commonly used. Umbundu is also spoken. Bengo Province and Cuanza Norte Province are located to its north. Malanje and Bie Provinces are located to its east, while Huambo and Benguela provinces border it in south. The province's coastline on the Atlantic Ocean is 180 kilometres (110 mi) in length. Cuanza Sul city lies on the southern bank of the Cuanza River.

== Municipalities ==
Within Cuanza Sul Province includes the following municipalities:

- Amboim (Gabela)
- Cassongue
- Conda
- Ebo
- Libolo (Calulo)
- Mussende
- Porto Amboim
- Quibala
- Quilenda
- Seles (Uku Seles)
- Sumbe (Ngangula)
- Waku-Kungo (Cela)

== Communes ==
The province of Cuanza Sul contains the following communes (Portuguese: comunas); sorted by their respective municipalities:

- Amboim Municipality: – Assango, Gabela
- Cassongue Municipality: – Atôme, Cassongue, Dumbi, Pambangala (Pampangala)
- Conda Municipality: – Conda, Cunjo
- Ebo Municipality: – Condé, Ebo, Kassange (Quissanje)
- Libolo Municipality: – Cabuta (Kabuta), Calulo, Munenga, Quissongo (Kissongo)
- Mussende Municipality: – Mussende, Quienha (Kienha), São Lucas
- Porto Amboim Municipality: – Capolo (Kapolo), Porto Amboim
- Quibala Municipality: – Cariango (Kariango), Dala Cachibo, Lonhe, Quibala (Kibala)
- Quilenda Municipality: – Quilenda (Kilenda), Quirimbo (Kirimbo)
- Seles Municipality: – Amboiva, Botera, Seles
- Sumbe Municipality: – Gangula (Ngangula), Gungo, Quicombo (Kicombo), Sumbe
- Waku-Kungo (Cela) Municipality: – Kissanga Kungo (Quissanga Cunjo), Sanga, Uaco Cungo

== Administration ==
The province's governor is Eusébio de Brito Teixeira. António da Gama Lopes Teixeira, Mateus Alves Morais de Brito and Maria de Lourdes Sousa Abambres Veiga are deputy governors for Technical and infrastructure Services, Economic Sector Area and Political and Social Sector Area respectively.

== Economy and education ==
Coffee, cotton, fruits, rice and tobacco are the major agricultural products. The province has large deposits of alluvial and eluvial diamonds and Gypsum. Sumbe and Porto Amboim are major fish processing centres.

The Independent University of Angola is located in the province's capital and has emerged as the most important educational centre in the province. Established in August 2003 it offers courses in agronomy, veterinary science and forestry.

== List of governors of Cuanza Sul ==
Name	Years in office
Manuel da Cruz Gaspar	1975–1977
Luís Doukui Paulo de Castro	1977–1979
Armando Fandano Ndembo	1979–1982
Francisco José Ramos da Cruz	1982–1992
Aurélio Segunda	1992–1994
Francisco José Ramos da Cruz	1994–1999
Francisco Higino Lopes Carneiro	1999–2002
Serafim Maria do Prado	2002–2012
Eusébio de Brito Teixeira	2012–2019
Job Pedro Castelo Capapinha	2019–

Up to 1991, the official name was Provincial Commissioner

== See also ==
- Coçoço
- Fort of Kikombo
