= K. V. Sarma =

Indian historian of science (1919–2005)

K. Venkateswara Sarma
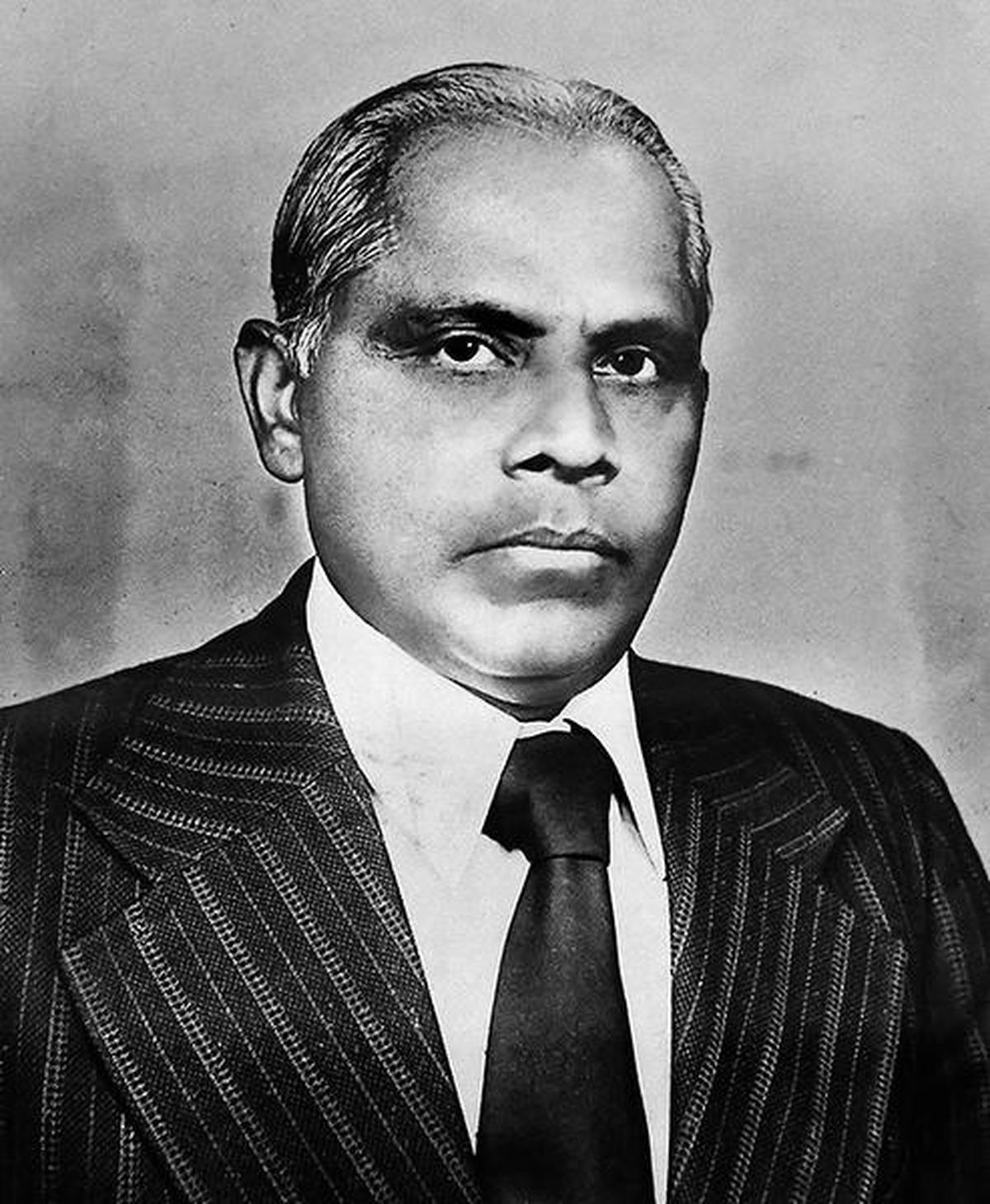
- Born: 22 December 1919; Chengannur, Kerala
- Died: 13 January 2005 (aged 85)
- Citizenship: Indian
- Education: Maharaja's College of Science and Maharaja's College of Arts, Thiruvananthapuram
- Known for: A History of the Kerala School of Hindu Astronomy
- Scientific career
- Fields: History of astronomy History of mathematics

Krishna Venkateswara Sarma (1919–2005) was an Indian historian of science, particularly the astronomy and mathematics of the Kerala school. He was responsible for bringing to light several of the achievements of the Kerala school. He was editor of the Vishveshvaranand Indological Research Series, and published the critical edition of several source works in Sanskrit, including the Aryabhatiya of Aryabhata. He was recognised as "the greatest authority on Kerala's astronomical tradition".

== Biography ==
Sarma's father, Sri S. Krishna Aiyer, was an inspector of schools. Sarma studied chemistry and physics at Maharaja's College of Science in Thiruvananthapuram, receiving his bachelor's degree in 1940. He went on to study Sanskrit at the College of Arts, receiving a master's degree in 1942 from Kerala University. In 1944 he began his work with palm-leaf manuscripts at Oriental Research Institute & Manuscripts Library where he developed his specialties of manuscriptology and textual criticism.

Sarma joined the Sanskrit department of the University of Madras in 1951 as research assistant in the New Catalogues Project,

In 1962 he became curator of the Vishveshvaranand Research Institute, Hoshiarpur which had a A Vedic Word Concordance. Sarma took an interest in the Kerala school of astronomy and mathematics and assembled a bibliography. In 1965 Panjab University assimilated the institute, and Sarma became a lecturer in Sanskrit with the university. He was named reader in 1972.

Sarma's book A History of the Kerala School of Hindu Astronomy recounted the development of astronomy associated with Kerala. In the preface of A History, Sarma described his research "under the supervision of Prof. Ramaswami Sastri, concurrently with my duties as the Supervising Pundit of the Cataloguing Section of the University Oriental Manuscripts Library, Trivandrum. My intimate association, later, with the compilation of the New Catalogus Cataloguum of Sanskrit Works and Authors at Madras university also proved to be of great help in my work."

Sarma became acting-director of Vishveshvaranand Research Institute in 1975, and director/professor in 1978 when he was awarded Doctor of Letters.

He retired from Panjab University in 1980, but the next year accepted the position of honorary professor of Sanskrit at the Adyar Library Research Center.

He was the author of thirty-five entries in the Encyclopaedia of the History of Science, Technology, and Medicine in Non-Western Cultures. For example, in one article he says

Rationale in Hindu mathematics and astronomy is expressed by the terms Yukti and Upapatti, both meaning "the logical principles implied". It is characteristic of Western scientific tradition, from the times of Euclid and Aristotle up to modern times, to enunciate and deduce using step-by-step reasoning. Such a practice is almost absent in the Indian tradition, even though the same background tasks, of collecting and correlating data, identifying and analyzing methodologies, and arguing out possible answers have to be gone through before arriving at results.

Sarma then provides the exceptions: five commentaries, the Yuktibhasa and astronomical commentaries, and Ganita-yukti-bhasa.

Sarma was the author of more than 60 books, and 145 research papers, in addition to other academic writing on Sanskrit and Indology. He continued publishing well into his late eighties, his last book being Science Texts in Sanskrit in Manuscripts Repositories of Kerala and Tamil Nadu, published in 2003.

He died on 13 January 2005, having just completed English translations (see Ganita-yukti-bhasa) of the Yuktibhāṣā of Jyesthadeva and the Tantrasangraha of Nilakantha Somayaji.

== Some important works ==
- 1954: Grahacaranibandhana: A Parahita manual by Haridatta, Kuppuswamy Research Foundation, Madras
- 1972: A History of the Kerala School of Hindu Astronomy, Vishveshvaranand Vedic Research Institute, Hoshiapur
- 1972: A Bibliography of Kerala and Kerala-based Astronomy and Astrology, Vishveshvaranand Vedic Research Institute, Hoshiapur
- 1975: Līlāvatī of Bhāskarācārya with Kriyākramakarī of Śaṅkara and Nārāyaṇa. Being an Elaborate Exposition of the Rationale of Hindu Mathematics. Critically edited with Introduction and Appendices, Vishveshvaranand Vedic Research Institute, Hoshiapur
- 1976: (with K. S. Shukla) Āryabhaṭīya of Āryabhaṭa, Indian National Science Academy
- 1990: Observational Astronomy in India, Department of Sanskrit, University of Calicut.
- 1991: (with S. Hariharan) Yuktibhāṣā of Jyeṣṭhadeva: A book on rationales in Indian Mathematics and Astronomy—An analytic appraisal (PDF) via Internet Archive

== Complete bibliography of the writings of K. V. Sarma ==
A complete bibliography of the writings of K. V. Sarma on Indian culture, science and literature was compiled by S. A. S. Sarma and published by Sri Sarada Education Society Research Centre, Adyar, Chennai, in 2000. This runs to about 60 pages. The bibliography is available at the following link:

- Complete Bibliography (archived)

== K. V. Sarma Research Foundation ==
During the last decade of his life, Prof. Sarma began to convert his personal library into an institution. At first it was called Sree Sarada Education Society, but was later renamed the K. V. Sarma Research Foundation. Prof. Sarma himself was the first director, with Dr Mamata Mishra as secretary and Dr Achyuta Bhat as librarian. The foundation houses approximately 10,000 books, 2000 journals and 900 manuscripts. At the time of writing (2020) the director is Prof. Siniruddha Dash, retired professor of Sanskrit at the University of Madras. The foundation's president and vice-president are Prof. M. S. Sriram and Prof. M. D. Srinivas respectively.
