= Clemency Montelle =

New Zealand historian of mathematics

Clemency Montelle (born 8 July 1977) is a New Zealand historian of mathematics known for her research on Indian mathematics and Indian astronomy. She is a professor of mathematics at the University of Canterbury, and a fellow of the New Zealand India Research Institute of the Victoria University of Wellington.

== Education ==
Montelle is originally from Christchurch. She earned first class honours in mathematics and classical studies at the University of Canterbury in 1999, and completed a master's degree there in 2000. It was not until the fourth year of her studies that, finding a copy of Euclid's Elements in the original Greek, she realized that she could reconcile her two interests by working in the history of mathematics.

She became a Fulbright Scholar at Brown University, where she learned Cuneiform, Sanskrit, and Arabic. She completed a Ph.D. in the history of mathematics there in 2005; at Brown, her faculty mentors included David Pingree, Alice Slotsky, and Kim Plofker.

== Service ==
Montelle was vice president of the Commission for the History of Ancient and Medieval Astronomy for the 2017–2021 term. In 2026, she was awarded the Agnes Mary Clerke Medal for the History of Astronomy by the Royal Astronomical Society.

== Books ==
Montelle is the author of the book Chasing Shadows: Mathematics, Astronomy, and the Early Reckoning of Eclipse theory (Johns Hopkins Press, 2011). With Kim Plofker, she is the coauthor of Sanskrit Astronomical Tables (Springer, 2019).
