= Kim Plofker =

American mathematician (born 1964)

Kim Leslie Plofker
- Born: November 25, 1964 (age 61); Chennai, India
- Education: Haverford College, Brown University
- Known for: History of Indian mathematics; Mathematics in India (2009); Sanskrit Astronomical Tables (2019)
- Awards: Brouwer Medal (2011)
- Scientific career
- Fields: History of mathematics
- Workplaces: Union College, Brown University, MIT, Utrecht University
- Doctoral advisor: David Pingree

Kim Leslie Plofker (born November 25, 1964) is an American historian of mathematics, specializing in Indian mathematics.

== Education and career ==
Born in Chennai, India, Plofker received her bachelor's degree in mathematics from Haverford College. She received her Ph.D. in 1995 while studying with adviser David Pingree (Mathematical Approximation by Transformation of Sine Functions in Medieval Sanskrit Astronomical Texts) from Brown University, where she conducted research and later joined as a guest professor.

In the late 1990s, she was Technical Director of the American Committee for South Asian Manuscripts of the American Oriental Society, where she was also concerned with the development of programs for the text comparison. From 2000 to 2004, she was at the Dibner Institute for the History of Science and Technology at the Massachusetts Institute of Technology. During 2004 and 2005, she was a visiting professor in Utrecht and at the same time Fellow of the International Institute for Asian Studies in Leiden. She is currently an associate professor at Union College in Schenectady.

== Contributions ==
Plofker deals with the history of Indian mathematics, the topic of her 2009 book Mathematics in India. She is particularly interested in the exchange of mathematics and astronomy between India and Islam in the Middle Ages and generally in the exact sciences between Europe and Asia from antiquity to the 20th Century.

With Clemency Montelle, she is the coauthor of Sanskrit Astronomical Tables (Springer, 2019).

== Recognition ==
In 2010 she gave a plenary lecture at the International Congress of Mathematicians, Hyderabad (Indian rules, Yavana rules: foreign identity and the transmission of mathematics). In 2011, she was awarded the Brouwer Medal of the Royal Dutch Mathematical Society.
