= List of factorial and binomial topics =

This is a list of factorial and binomial topics in mathematics. See also binomial (disambiguation).

- Abel's binomial theorem
- Alternating factorial
- Antichain
- Beta function
- Bhargava factorial
- Binomial coefficient
  - Pascal's triangle
- Binomial distribution
- Binomial proportion confidence interval
- Binomial-QMF (Daubechies wavelet filters)
- Binomial series
- Binomial theorem
- Binomial transform
- Binomial type
- Carlson's theorem
- Catalan number
  - Fuss–Catalan number
- Central binomial coefficient
- Combination
- Combinatorial number system
- De Polignac's formula
- Difference operator
- Difference polynomials
- Digamma function
- Egorychev method
- Erdős–Ko–Rado theorem
- Euler–Mascheroni constant
- Faà di Bruno's formula
- Factorial
- Factorial moment
- Factorial number system
- Factorial prime
- Factoriangular number
- Gamma distribution
- Gamma function
- Gaussian binomial coefficient
- Gould's sequence
- Hyperfactorial
- Hypergeometric distribution
- Hypergeometric function identities
- Hypergeometric series
- Incomplete beta function
- Incomplete gamma function
- Jordan–Pólya number
- Kempner function
- Lah number
- Lanczos approximation
- Lozanić's triangle
- Macaulay representation of an integer
- Mahler's theorem
- Multinomial distribution
- Multinomial coefficient, Multinomial formula, Multinomial theorem
- Multiplicities of entries in Pascal's triangle
- Multiset
- Multivariate gamma function
- Narayana numbers
- Negative binomial distribution
- Nörlund–Rice integral
- Pascal matrix
- Pascal's pyramid
- Pascal's simplex
- Pascal's triangle
- Permutation
  - List of permutation topics
- Pochhammer symbol (also falling, lower, rising, upper factorials)
- Poisson distribution
- Polygamma function
- Primorial
- Proof of Bertrand's postulate
- Sierpinski triangle
- Star of David theorem
- Stirling number
- Stirling transform
- Stirling's approximation
- Subfactorial
- Table of Newtonian series
- Taylor series
- Trinomial expansion
- Vandermonde's identity
- Wilson prime
- Wilson's theorem
- Wolstenholme prime
