= Trinomial coefficient =

Trinomial coefficient may refer to:

- coefficients in the trinomial expansion of (a + b + c)^{n}.
- coefficients in the trinomial triangle and expansion of (x^{2} + x + 1)^{n}.
