= Binomial identity =

Binomial identity may refer to:

- Binomial theorem
- Binomial type

== See also ==
- Binomial (disambiguation)
