= Trinomial expansion =

Formula in mathematics

Layers of Pascal's pyramid derived from coefficients in an upside-down ternary plot of the terms in the expansions of the powers of a trinomial – the number of terms is clearly a triangular number

In mathematics, a trinomial expansion is the expansion of a power of a sum of three terms into monomials. The expansion is given by

$(a+b+c)^n = \sum_{{i,j,k}\atop{i+j+k=n}} {n \choose i,j,k}\, a^i \, b^{\;\! j} \;\! c^k,$

where n is a nonnegative integer and the sum is taken over all combinations of nonnegative indices i, j, and k such that i + j + k = n. The trinomial coefficients are given by

$${n \choose i,j,k} = \frac{n!}{i!\,j!\,k!} \,.$$

This formula is a special case of the multinomial formula for m = 3. The coefficients can be defined with a generalization of Pascal's triangle to three dimensions, called Pascal's pyramid or Pascal's tetrahedron.

== Derivation ==
The trinomial expansion can be calculated by applying the binomial expansion twice, setting $d = b+c$, which leads to

$$\begin{align}
(a+b+c)^n &= (a+d)^n = \sum_{r=0}^{n} {n \choose r}\, a^{n-r}\, d^{r} \\
&= \sum_{r=0}^{n} {n \choose r}\, a^{n-r}\, (b+c)^{r} \\
&= \sum_{r=0}^{n} {n \choose r}\, a^{n-r}\, \sum_{s=0}^{r} {r \choose s}\, b^{r-s}\,c^{s}.
\end{align}$$

Above, the resulting $(b+c)^{r}$ in the second line is evaluated by the second application of the binomial expansion, introducing another summation over the index $s$.

The product of the two binomial coefficients is simplified by shortening $r!$,

$${n \choose r}\,{r \choose s} = \frac{n!}{r!(n-r)!} \frac{r!}{s!(r-s)!}
= \frac{n!}{(n-r)!(r-s)!s!},$$

and comparing the index combinations here with the ones in the exponents, they can be relabelled to $i=n-r, ~ j=r-s, ~ k = s$, which provides the expression given in the first paragraph.

== Properties ==
The number of terms of an expanded trinomial is the triangular number

$$t_{n+1} = \frac{(n+2)(n+1)}{2},$$

where n is the exponent to which the trinomial is raised.

== Example ==
Examples of trinomial expansions with $n=2,3,4$ are:

$(a+b+c)^2=a^2+b^2+c^2+2(ab+bc+ac)$

$(a+b+c)^3=a^3+b^3+c^3+3(a^2b+ab^2+b^2c+bc^2+ac^2+a^2c) + 6abc$

$(a+b+c)^4=a^4+b^4+c^4+4(a^3b+ab^3+b^3c+bc^3+a^3c+ac^3) + 6(a^2b^2+b^2c^2+a^2c^2) + 12(a^2bc+ab^2c+abc^2)$

== See also ==
- Binomial expansion
- Multinomial coefficient
- Pascal's pyramid
- Trinomial triangle
