= Binomial =

Binomial may refer to:

== In mathematics ==
- Binomial (polynomial), a polynomial with two terms
- Binomial coefficient, numbers appearing in the expansions of powers of binomials
- Binomial QMF, a perfect-reconstruction orthogonal wavelet decomposition
- Binomial theorem, a theorem about powers of binomials
- Binomial type, a property of sequences of polynomials
- Binomial series, a mathematical series

== In probability and statistics ==
- Binomial distribution, a type of probability distribution
- Binomial process
- Binomial test, a test of significance

== In computing science ==
- Binomial heap, a data structure

== In linguistics ==
- Binomial pair, a sequence of two or more words or phrases in the same grammatical category, having some semantic relationship and joined by some syntactic device

== In biology ==
- Binomial nomenclature, a Latin two-term name for a species, such as Sequoia sempervirens

== In finance ==
- Binomial options pricing model, a numerical method for the valuation of options

== In politics ==
- Binomial voting system, a voting system used in the parliamentary elections of Chile between 1989 and 2013

== See also ==
- List of factorial and binomial topics
