= Pascal's pyramid =

Arrangement of trinomial coefficients

Pascal's pyramid's first five layers. Each face (orange grid) is Pascal's triangle. Arrows show derivation of two example terms.

In mathematics, Pascal's pyramid is a three-dimensional arrangement of the coefficients of the trinomial expansion and the trinomial distribution. Pascal's pyramid is the three-dimensional analog of the two-dimensional Pascal's triangle, which contains the binomial coefficients that appear in the binomial expansion and the binomial distribution. The binomial and trinomial coefficients, expansions, and distributions are subsets of the multinomial constructs with the same names.

== Structure of the tetrahedron ==
Because the tetrahedron is a three-dimensional object, displaying it on a piece of paper, a computer screen, or other two-dimensional medium is difficult. Assume the tetrahedron is divided into a number of levels, floors, slices, or layers. The top layer (the apex) is labeled "Layer 0". Other layers can be thought of as overhead views of the tetrahedron with the previous layers removed. The first six layers are as follows:

Derivation of the first five levels of Pascal's pyramid – where multiple values point to a number, the values are summed

Layer 0	1

Layer 1	1		1
Layer 1		1

Layer 2	1		2		1
Layer 2		2		2
Layer 2			1

Layer 3	1		3		3		1
Layer 3		3		6		3
Layer 3			3		3
Layer 3				1

Layer 4	1		4		6		4		1
Layer 4		4		12		12		4
Layer 4			6		12		6
Layer 4				4		4
Layer 4					1

Layer 5	1		5		10		10		5		1
Layer 5		5		20		30		20		5
Layer 5			10		30		30		10
Layer 5				10		20		10
Layer 5					5		5
Layer 5						1

The layers of the tetrahedron have been deliberately displayed with the point down so that they are not individually confused with Pascal's triangle.

== Overview of the tetrahedron ==
- There is three-way symmetry of the numbers in each layer.
- The number of terms in the n^{th} layer is the (n + 1)^{th} triangular number: $\frac{(n + 1)(n + 2)} 2$.
- The sum of the values of the numbers in the n^{th} layer is 3^{n}.
- Each number in any layer is the sum of the three adjacent numbers in the layer above.
- Each number in any layer is a simple whole number ratio of the adjacent numbers in the same layer.
- Each number in any layer is a coefficient of the trinomial distribution and the trinomial expansion. This non-linear arrangement makes it easier to:
  - display the trinomial expansion in a coherent way;
  - compute the coefficients of the trinomial distribution;
  - calculate the numbers of any tetrahedron layer.
- The numbers along the three edges of the n^{th} layer are the numbers of the n^{th} line of Pascal's triangle. And almost all the properties listed above have parallels with Pascal's triangle and multinomial coefficients.

== Trinomial expansion connection ==
The numbers of the tetrahedron are derived from the trinomial expansion. The n^{th} layer consists of all the coefficients when the trinomial $A + B + C$ is raised to the n^{th} power. The n^{th} power of the trinomial is expanded by repeatedly multiplying the trinomial by itself:

$(A + B + C)(A + B + C)^n = (A + B + C)^{n+1}$

Layers of Pascal's pyramid derived from coefficients of an upside-down ternary plot of the terms in the expansions of the powers of a trinomial

Each term in the first expression is multiplied by each term in the second expression; and then the coefficients of like terms (same variables and exponents) are added together. Here is the expansion of (A + B + C)^{4}:

1A^{4}B^{0}C^{0} + 4A^{3}B^{0}C^{1} + 6A^{2}B^{0}C^{2} + 4A^{1}B^{0}C^{3} + 1A^{0}B^{0}C^{4} +

4A^{3}B^{1}C^{0} + 12A^{2}B^{1}C^{1} + 12A^{1}B^{1}C^{2} + 4A^{0}B^{1}C^{3} +
6A^{2}B^{2}C^{0} + 12A^{1}B^{2}C^{1} + 6A^{0}B^{2}C^{2} +
4A^{1}B^{3}C^{0} + 4A^{0}B^{3}C^{1} +

1A^{0}B^{4}C^{0}

Writing the expansion in this non-linear way shows the expansion in a more understandable way. It also makes the connection with the tetrahedron obvious−the coefficients here match those of layer 4. All the implicit coefficients, variables, and exponents, which are normally not written, are also shown to illustrate another relationship with the tetrahedron. (Usually, "1A" is "A"; "B^{1}" is "B"; and "C^{0}" is "1"; etc.) The exponents of each term sum to the layer number (n), or 4, in this case. More significantly, the value of the coefficients of each term can be computed directly from the exponents. The formula is ((x+y+z)!)/x!y!z! , where x, y, z are the exponents of A, B, C, respectively, and "!" is the factorial, i. e.: $n! = 1 \cdot 2 \cdot 3 \cdots n$. The exponent formulas for the 4th layer are:

$\textstyle {(4+0+0)!\over 4!\cdot 0!\cdot 0!} \ {(3+0+1)!\over 3!\cdot 0!\cdot 1!} \ {(2+0+2)!\over 2!\cdot 0!\cdot 2!} \ {(1+0+3)!\over 1!\cdot 0!\cdot 3!} \ {(0+0+4)!\over 0!\cdot 0!\cdot 4!}$

$\textstyle {(3+1+0)!\over 3!\cdot 1!\cdot 0!} \ {(2+1+1)!\over 2!\cdot 1!\cdot 1!} \ {(1+1+2)!\over 1!\cdot 1!\cdot 2!} \ {(0+1+3)!\over 0!\cdot 1!\cdot 3!}$

$\textstyle {(2+2+0)!\over 2!\cdot 2!\cdot 0!} \ {(1+2+1)!\over 1!\cdot 2!\cdot 1!} \ {(0+2+2)!\over 0!\cdot 2!\cdot 2!}$

$\textstyle {(1+3+0)!\over 1!\cdot 3!\cdot 0!} \ {(0+3+1)!\over 0!\cdot 3!\cdot 1!}$

$\textstyle {(0+4+0)!\over 0!\cdot 4!\cdot 0!}$

The exponents of each expansion term can be clearly seen and these formulae simplify to the expansion coefficients and the tetrahedron coefficients of layer 4.

== Trinomial distribution connection ==
The numbers of the tetrahedron can also be found in the trinomial distribution. This is a discrete probability distribution used to determine the chance some combination of events occurs given three possible outcomes−the number of ways the events could occur is multiplied by the probabilities that they would occur. The formula for the trinomial distribution is:

$\frac{n!}{x! y! z!} (P_A)^x(P_B)^y(P_C)^z$

where x, y, z are the number of times each of the three outcomes does occur; n is the number of trials and equals the sum of x+y+z; and P_{A}, P_{B}, P_{C} are the probabilities that each of the three events could occur.

For example, in a three-way election, the candidates got these votes: A, 16 %; B, 30 %; C, 54 %. What is the chance that a randomly selected four-person focus group would contain the following voters: 1 for A, 1 for B, 2 for C? The answer is:

$\frac{4!}{1! 1! 2!} (16\,\%)^1(30\,\%)^1(54\,\%)^2 = 12 \times 0.0139968 \approx 17\,\%$

The number 12 is the coefficient of this probability and it is number of combinations that can fill this "112" focus group. There are 15 different arrangements of four-person focus groups that can be selected. Expressions for all 15 of these coefficients are:

$\textstyle {4!\over 4!\cdot 0!\cdot 0!} \ {4!\over 3!\cdot 0!\cdot 1!} \ {4!\over 2!\cdot 0!\cdot 2!} \ {4!\over 1!\cdot 0!\cdot 3!} \ {4!\over 0!\cdot 0!\cdot 4!}$

$\textstyle {4!\over 3!\cdot 1!\cdot 0!} \ {4!\over 2!\cdot 1!\cdot 1!} \ {4!\over 1!\cdot 1!\cdot 2!} \ {4!\over 0!\cdot 1!\cdot 3!}$

$\textstyle {4!\over 2!\cdot 2!\cdot 0!} \ {4!\over 1!\cdot 2!\cdot 1!} \ {4!\over 0!\cdot 2!\cdot 2!}$

$\textstyle {4!\over 1!\cdot 3!\cdot 0!} \ {4!\over 0!\cdot 3!\cdot 1!}$

$\textstyle {4!\over 0!\cdot 4!\cdot 0!}$

The numerator of these fractions (above the line) is the same for all expressions. It is the sample size−a four-person group−and indicates that the coefficients of these arrangements can be found on layer 4 of the tetrahedron. The three numbers of the denominator (below the line) are the number of the focus group members that voted for A, B, C, respectively.

Shorthand is normally used to express combinatorial functions in the following "choose" format (which is read as "4 choose 4, 0, 0", etc.).

$\textstyle {4\choose 4,0,0} \ {4\choose 3,0,1} \ {4\choose 2,0,2} \ {4\choose 1,0,3} \ {4\choose 0,0,4}$

$\textstyle {4\choose 3,1,0} \ {4\choose 2,1,1} \ {4\choose 1,1,2} \ {4\choose 0,1,3}$

$\textstyle {4\choose 2,2,0} \ {4\choose 1,2,1} \ {4\choose 0,2,2}$

$\textstyle {4\choose 1,3,0} \ {4\choose 0,3,1}$

$\textstyle {4\choose 0,4,0}$

But the value of these expression is still equal to the coefficients of the 4th layer of the tetrahedron. And they can be generalized to any layer by changing the sample size (n).

This notation makes an easy way to express the sum of all the coefficients of layer n:

$\textstyle \sum_{x,y,z} {n \choose x,y,z} = 3^n$.

== Addition of coefficients between layers ==
The numbers on every layer (n) of the tetrahedron are the sum of the three adjacent numbers in the layer (n−1) "above" it. This relationship is rather difficult to see without intermingling the layers. Below are italic layer 3 numbers interleaved among bold layer 4 numbers:

1	4	6	4	1
1	3	3	1
4	12	12	4
3	6	3
6	12	6
3	3
4	4
1
1

The relationship is illustrated by the lower, central number 12 of the 4th layer. It is "surrounded" by three numbers of the 3rd layer: 6 to the "north", 3 to the "southwest", 3 to the "southeast". (The numbers along the edge have only two adjacent numbers in the layer "above" and the three corner numbers have only one adjacent number in the layer above, which is why they are always "1". The missing numbers can be assumed as "0", so there is no loss of generality.) This relationship between adjacent layers comes about through the two-step trinomial expansion process.

Continuing with this example, in Step 1, each term of (A + B + C)^{3} is multiplied by each term of (A + B + C)^{1}. Only three of these multiplications are of interest in this example:

Layer 3 term	Multiply by	Product term
6A^{1}B^{1}C^{1}	1B^{1}	6A^{1}B^{2}C^{1}
3A^{1}B^{2}C^{0}	1C^{1}	3A^{1}B^{2}C^{1}
3A^{0}B^{2}C^{1}	1A^{1}	3A^{1}B^{2}C^{1}

Then in Step 2, the summation of like terms (same variables and exponents) results in: 12A^{1}B^{2}C^{1}, which is the term of (A + B + C)^{4}; while 12 is the coefficient of the 4th layer of the tetrahedron.

Symbolically, the additive relation can be expressed as:

$$C(x,y,z) = C(x-1,y,z) + C(x,y-1,z) + C(x,y,z-1)$$

where C(x,y,z) is the coefficient of the term with exponents x, y, z and $x+y+z = n$ is the layer of the tetrahedron.

This relationship will work only if the trinomial expansion is laid out in the non-linear fashion as it is portrayed in the section on the "trinomial expansion connection".

== Ratio between coefficients of same layer ==
On each layer of the tetrahedron, the numbers are simple whole number ratios of the adjacent numbers. This relationship is illustrated for horizontally adjacent pairs on the 4th layer by the following:

1 ⟨1:4⟩ 4 ⟨2:3⟩ 6 ⟨3:2⟩ 4 ⟨4:1⟩ 1
4 ⟨1:3⟩ 12 ⟨2:2⟩ 12 ⟨3:1⟩ 4
6 ⟨1:2⟩ 12 ⟨2:1⟩ 6
4 ⟨1:1⟩ 4
1

Because the tetrahedron has three-way symmetry, the ratio relation also holds for diagonal pairs in both directions, as well as for the horizontal pairs shown.

The ratios are controlled by the exponents of the corresponding adjacent terms of the trinomial expansion. For example, one ratio in the illustration above is:

4 ⟨1:3⟩ 12

The corresponding terms of the trinomial expansion are:

$4A^3B^1C^0$ and $12A^2B^1C^1$

The following rules apply to the coefficients of all adjacent pairs of terms of the trinomial expansion:

- The exponent of one of the variables remains unchanged (B in this case) and can be ignored.
- For the other two variables, one exponent increases by 1 and one exponent decreases by 1.
  - The exponents of A are 3 and 2 (the larger being in the left term).
  - The exponents of C are 0 and 1 (the larger being in the right term).
- The coefficients and larger exponents are related:
  - 4 × 3 = 12 × 1
  - 4 / 12 = 1 / 3
- These equations yield the ratio: "1:3".

The rules are the same for all horizontal and diagonal pairs. The variables A, B, C will change.

This ratio relationship provides another (somewhat cumbersome) way to calculate tetrahedron coefficients:

The coefficient of the adjacent term equals the coefficient of the current term multiplied by the current-term exponent of the decreasing variable divided by the adjacent-term exponent of the increasing variable.

The ratio of the adjacent coefficients may be a little clearer when expressed symbolically. Each term can have up to six adjacent terms:

For x = 0: $C(x,y,z-1) = C(x,y-1,z) \cdot \frac{z}{y}, \quad C(x,y-1,z) = C(x,y,z-1) \cdot \frac{y}{z}$
For y = 0: $C(x-1,y,z) = C(x,y,z-1) \cdot \frac{x}{z}, \quad C(x,y,z-1) = C(x-1,y,z) \cdot \frac{z}{x}$
For z = 0: $C(x,y-1,z) = C(x-1,y,z) \cdot \frac{y}{x}, \quad C(x-1,y,z) = C(x,y-1,z) \cdot \frac{x}{y}$

where C(x,y,z) is the coefficient and x, y, z are the exponents. In the days before pocket calculators and personal computers, this approach was used as a school-boy short-cut to write out binomial expansions without the tedious algebraic expansions or clumsy factorial computations.

This relationship will work only if the trinomial expansion is laid out in the non-linear fashion as it is portrayed in the section on the "trinomial expansion connection".

== Relationship with Pascal's triangle ==
It is well known that the numbers along the three outside edges of the n^{th} layer of the tetrahedron are the same numbers as the n^{th} line of Pascal's triangle. However, the connection is actually much more extensive than just one row of numbers. This relationship is best illustrated by comparing Pascal's triangle down to line 4 with layer 4 of the tetrahedron.

Pascal's triangle
1
1 1
1 2 1
1 3 3 1
1 4 6 4 1

Tetrahedron Layer 4
1 4 6 4 1
4 12 12 4
6 12 6
4 4
1

Multiplying the numbers of each line of Pascal's triangle down to the n^{th} line by the numbers of the n^{th} line generates the n^{th} layer of the tetrahedron. In the following example, the lines of Pascal's triangle are in italic font and the rows of the tetrahedron are in bold font.

1

× 1 =
1

1 1
× 4 =
4 4

1 2 1
× 6 =
6 12 6

1 3 3 1
× 4 =
4 12 12 4

1 4 6 4 1
× 1 =

1 4 6 4 1

The multipliers (1 4 6 4 1) compose line 4 of Pascal's triangle.

This relationship demonstrates the fastest and easiest way to compute the numbers for any layer of the tetrahedron without computing factorials, which quickly become huge numbers. (Extended precision calculators become very slow beyond tetrahedron layer 200.)

If the coefficients of Pascal's triangle are labeled C(i,j) and the coefficients of the tetrahedron are labeled C(n,i,j), where n is the layer of the tetrahedron, i is the row, and j is the column, then the relation can be expressed symbolically as:

$$C(i,j) \times C(n,i) = C(n,i,j),\quad 0 \leq i \leq n,\ 0 \leq j \leq i$$

[i, j, n are not exponents here, just sequential labeling indexes.]

== Other properties ==
=== Exponential construction ===
Arbitrary layer n can be obtained in a single step using the following formula:

$$\left(b^{d\left(n+1\right)}+b^d+1\right)^n,$$

where b is the radix and d is the number of digits of any of the central multinomial coefficients, that is

$$\textstyle d=1+\left\lfloor\log_b{n\choose k_1,k_2,k_3}\right\rfloor,\ \sum_{i=1}^3{k_i} = n,\ \left\lfloor\frac{n}{3}\right\rfloor \le k_i \le \left\lceil\frac{n}{3}\right\rceil,$$

then wrapping the digits of its result by d(n+1), spacing by d and removing leading zeros.

This method generalised to arbitrary dimension can be used to obtain slices of any Pascal's simplex.

==== Examples ====
For radix b = 10, n = 5, d = 2:

$$\textstyle\left(10^{12} + 10^2 + 1\right)^5$$

= 10000000001015
= 1000000000505000000102010000010303010000520302005010510100501

              1                     1                     1
   000000000505     00 00 00 00 05 05     .. .. .. .. .5 .5
   000000102010     00 00 00 10 20 10     .. .. .. 10 20 10
~  000010303010  ~  00 00 10 30 30 10  ~  .. .. 10 30 30 10
   000520302005     00 05 20 30 20 05     .. .5 20 30 20 .5
   010510100501     01 05 10 10 05 01     .1 .5 10 10 .5 .1

 wrapped by d(n+1)     spaced by d      leading zeros removed

For radix b = 10, n = 20, d = 9:

$$\textstyle\left(10^{189} + 10^9 + 1\right)^{20}$$

Pascal's pyramid layer #20.

=== Sum of coefficients of a layer by rows ===
Summing the numbers in each row of a layer n of Pascal's pyramid gives

$$\left(b^d + 2\right)^n,$$

where b is the radix and d is the number of digits of the sum of the 'central' row (the one with the greatest sum).

For radix b = 10:

 1 ~ 1    \ 1  ~ 1      \ 1   ~ 1          \ 1    ~  1               \ 1     ~  1
---      1 \ 1 ~ 02  \ 2 \ 2  ~ 04      \ 3 \ 3   ~ 06            \ 4 \ 4    ~ 08
 1       -----      1 \ 2 \ 1 ~ 04   \ 3 \ 6 \ 3  ~ 12         \ 6 \12 \ 6   ~ 24
         1  02      ---------       1 \ 3 \ 3 \ 1 ~ 08      \ 4 \12 \12 \ 4  ~ 32
                    1  04  04       -------------          1 \ 4 \ 6 \ 4 \ 1 ~ 16
                                    1  06  12  08         ------------------
                                                           1  08  24  32  16

1020      1021        1022               1023                     1024

=== Sum of coefficients of a layer by columns ===
Summing the numbers in each column of a layer n of Pascal's pyramid gives

$$\left(b^{2d} + b^d + 1\right)^n,$$

where b is the radix and d is the number of digits of the sum of the 'central' column (the one with the greatest sum).

For radix b = 10:

 1     |1|       |1|            |1|                     | 1|                              | 1|
---   1| |1    |2| |2|        |3| |3|                | 4|  | 4|                        | 5|  | 5|
 1    -----   1| |2| |1     |3| |6| |3|           | 6|  |12|  | 6|                  |10|  |20|  |10|
      1 1 1   ---------    1| |3| |3| |1       | 4|  |12|  |12|  | 4|            |10|  |30|  |30|  |10|
              1 2 3 2 1    -------------      1|  | 4|  | 6|  | 4|  | 1       | 5|  |20|  |30|  |20|  | 5|
                           1 3 6 7 6 3 1     --------------------------      1|  | 5|  |10|  |10|  | 5|  | 1
                                              1 04 10 16 19 16 10 04 01     --------------------------------
                                                                             1 05 15 30 45 51 45 30 15 05 01

1110   1111      1112           1113                    101014                             101015

== Higher-dimensional extensions ==
Instead of considering powers of a binomial or trinomial ($(x + y)^n$ or $(x + y + z)^n$), which result in Pascal's triangle and Pascal's pyramid, one could instead consider the coefficients when raising the multinomial $x_1 + x_2 + \ldots + x_m$ to various powers. If the multinomial has $m$ terms, resulting coefficients can be arranged to form a $m$-dimensional simplex. The entries of the $n$ level of the simplex are the multinomial coefficients $\binom{n}{k_1, k_2, \ldots, k_m} = \frac{n!}{k_1 ! \cdot k_2! \cdots k_m!}$ where $k_1, k_2, \ldots, k_m$ vary over all tuples of $m$ nonnegative integers that sum to $n$. Each face of the $m$-dimensional simplex gives a copy of the $m - 1$-dimensional simplex, and arises by considering those terms in the multinomial expansion for which $x_m$ does not appear (i.e., appears with power $0$). The arrangement of the points for $m = 1$ through $m = 4$ ((sequence A189225 in the OEIS)) into a simplex are illustrated below

=== Number of coefficients ===
For the nth component ((m − 1)-simplex) of Pascal's m-simplex, the number of the coefficients of multinomial expansion it consists of is given by:

$${(n-1) + (m-1) \choose (m-1)} + {n + (m - 2) \choose (m - 2)} = {n + (m - 1) \choose (m - 1)} = \left(\!\! \binom{m}{n} \!\!\right),$$

(where the latter is the multichoose notation). We can see this either as a sum of the number of coefficients of an (n − 1)th component ((m − 1)-simplex) of Pascal's m-simplex with the number of coefficients of an nth component ((m − 2)-simplex) of Pascal's (m − 1)-simplex, or by a number of all possible partitions of an nth power among m exponents.

== Parallels with Pascal's triangle and multinomial coefficients ==
This table summarizes the properties of the trinomial expansion and the trinomial distribution. It compares them to the binomial and multinomial expansions and distributions:

Type of polynomial	bi-nomial	tri-nomial	multi-nomial
Order of polynomial	2	3	m
Example of polynomial	$A+B$	$A+B+C$	$A+B+C+\cdots+M$
Geometric structure^{[1]}	triangle	tetrahedron	m-simplex
Element structure	line	layer	group
Symmetry of element	2-way	3-way	m-way
Number of terms per element	n+1	((n+1)(n+2))/2	((n+1)(n+2)...(n+m−1))/((m−1)!) = ((n+m−1)!)/(n!(m−1)!)
Sum of coefficients per element	2^{n}	3^{n}	m^{n}
Example of term	A^{x}B^{y}	A^{x}B^{y}C^{z}	A^{x}B^{y}C^{z}...M^{m}
Sum of exponents, all terms	n	n	n
Coefficient equation^{[2]}	n!/x!y!	n!/x!y!z!	n!/(x! y! z! ... x_{m}!)
Sum of coefficients "above"	2	3	m
Ratio of adjacent coefficients	2	6	m(m−1)

- ^1 A simplex is the simplest linear geometric form that exists in any dimension. Tetrahedra and triangles are examples in 3 and 2 dimensions, respectively.
- ^2 The formula for the binomial coefficient is usually expressed as n!/(x!(n−x)!), where n−x = y.
