= Triangular array =

Numbers arranged in a triangle

The triangular array whose right-hand diagonal sequence consists of Bell numbers

In mathematics and computing, a triangular array of numbers, polynomials, or the like, is a doubly indexed sequence in which each row is only as long as the row's own index. That is, the ith row contains only i elements.

== Examples ==
Notable particular examples include these:

- The Bell triangle, whose numbers count the partitions of a set in which a given element is the largest singleton
- Catalan's triangle, which counts strings of matched parentheses
- Euler's triangle, which counts permutations with a given number of ascents
- Floyd's triangle, whose entries are all of the integers in order
- Hosoya's triangle, based on the Fibonacci numbers
- Lozanić's triangle, used in the mathematics of chemical compounds
- Narayana triangle, counting strings of balanced parentheses with a given number of distinct nestings
- Pascal's triangle, whose entries are the binomial coefficients
- Clark's triangle

Triangular arrays of integers in which each row is symmetric and begins and ends with 1 are sometimes called generalized Pascal triangles; examples include Pascal's triangle, the Narayana numbers, and the triangle of Eulerian numbers.

== Generalizations ==
Triangular arrays may list mathematical values other than numbers; for instance the Bell polynomials form a triangular array in which each array entry is a polynomial.

Arrays in which the length of each row grows as a linear function of the row number (rather than being equal to the row number) have also been considered.

== Applications ==
Romberg's method can be used to estimate the value of a definite integral by completing the values in a triangle of numbers.

The Boustrophedon transform uses a triangular array to transform one integer sequence into another.

In general, a triangular array is used to store any table indexed by two natural numbers where j ≤ i.

== Indexing ==
Storing a triangular array in a computer requires a mapping from the two-dimensional coordinates (i, j) to a linear memory address. If two triangular arrays of equal size are to be stored (such as in LU decomposition), they can be combined into a standard rectangular array. If there is only one array, or it must be easily appended to, the array may be stored where row i begins at the ith triangular number T_{i}. Just like a rectangular array, one multiplication is required to find the start of the row, but this multiplication is of two variables (i*(i+1)/2), so some optimizations such as using a sequence of shifts and adds are not available.

== See also ==
- Triangular number, the number of entries in such an array up to some particular row
