= Star of David theorem =

Mathematical result on arithmetic properties of binomial coefficients

The Star of David theorem (the rows of the Pascal triangle are shown as columns here).

The Star of David theorem is a mathematical result on arithmetic properties of binomial coefficients. It was discovered by Henry W. Gould in 1972.

== Statement ==
The greatest common divisors of the binomial coefficients forming each of the two triangles in the Star of David shape in Pascal's triangle are equal:

$$\begin{align}
& \gcd\left\{ \binom{n-1}{k-1}, \binom{n}{k+1}, \binom{n+1}{k}\right\} \\[8pt]
= {} & \gcd\left\{ \binom{n-1}{k}, \binom{n}{k-1}, \binom{n+1}{k+1}\right\}.
\end{align}$$

== Examples ==
Rows 8, 9, and 10 of Pascal's triangle are

		1		8		28		56		70		56		28		8		1
	1		9		36		84		126		126		84		36		9		1
1		10		45		120		210		252		210		120		45		10		1

For n=9, k=3 or n=9, k=6, the element 84 (circled bold) is surrounded by, in sequence, the elements 28, 56, 126, 210, 120 and 36 (bold). Taking alternating values, we have gcd(28, 126, 120) = 2 = gcd(56, 210, 36).

The element 36 (circled italics) is surrounded by the sequence 8, 28, 84, 120, 45 and 9 (italics), and taking alternating values we have gcd(8, 84, 45) = 1 = gcd(28, 120, 9).

== Generalization ==
The above greatest common divisor also equals $\gcd \left({n-1 \choose k-2}, {n-1 \choose k-1}, {n-1 \choose k}, {n-1 \choose k+1}\right).$ Thus in the above example for the element 84 (in its rightmost appearance), we also have gcd(70, 56, 28, 8) = 2. This result in turn has further generalizations.

== Related results ==
The two sets of three numbers which the Star of David theorem says have equal greatest common divisors also have equal products. For example, again observing that the element 84 is surrounded by, in sequence, the elements 28, 56, 126, 210, 120, 36, and again taking alternating values, we have 28×126×120 = 2^{6}×3^{3}×5×7^{2} = 56×210×36. This result can be confirmed by writing out each binomial coefficient in factorial form, using

$${a \choose b}=\frac{a!}{(a-b)!b!}.$$

== See also ==
- List of factorial and binomial topics
