= Trinomial triangle =

The trinomial triangle is a variation of Pascal's triangle. The difference between the two is that an entry in the trinomial triangle is the sum of the three (rather than the two in Pascal's triangle) entries above it:

$$\begin{matrix}
& &  &  & 1\\
& &  & 1& 1&1\\
& & 1& 2& 3&2&1\\
&1& 3& 6& 7&6&3&1\\
1&4&10&16&19&16&10&4&1\end{matrix}$$

The $k$-th entry of the $n$-th row is denoted by

$${n\choose k}_2$$.

Rows are counted starting from 0. The entries of the $n$-th row are indexed starting with $-n$ from the left, and the middle entry has index 0. The symmetry of the entries of a row about the middle entry is expressed by the relationship

$${n\choose k}_2={n\choose-k}_2$$

== Properties ==
The $n$-th row corresponds to the coefficients in the polynomial expansion of the trinomial $(1 + x + x^2)$ raised to the $n$-th power:

$$\left(1+x+x^2\right)^n= \sum _{j=0}^{2n}{n\choose j-n}_2 x^{j}=\sum _{k=-n}^{n}{n\choose k}_2 x^{n+k}$$

or, symmetrically,

$$\left(1+x+1/x\right)^n=\sum_{k=-n}^{n}{n\choose k}_2 x^k$$,

hence the alternative name trinomial coefficients because of their relationship to the multinomial coefficients:

$${n\choose k}_2=\sum_{\textstyle{0\leq\mu,\nu\leq n\atop\mu+2\nu=n+k}}\frac{n!}{\mu!\,\nu!\,(n-\mu-\nu)!}$$

Furthermore, the diagonals have interesting properties, such as their relationship to the triangular numbers.

The sum of the elements of $n$-th row is $3^n$.

== Recurrence formula ==
The trinomial coefficients can be generated using the following recurrence formula:

$${0\choose 0}_2=1$$,

${n+1\choose k}_2={n\choose k-1}_2+{n\choose k}_2+{n\choose k+1}_2$ for $n\geq 0$,

where ${n\choose k}_2=0$ for $\ k<-n$ and $\ k>n$.

== Central trinomial coefficients ==
The middle entries of the trinomial triangle

1, 1, 3, 7, 19, 51, 141, 393, 1107, 3139, … (sequence A002426 in the OEIS)

were studied by Euler and are known as central trinomial coefficients.

The only known prime central trinomial coefficients are 3, 7 and 19 at n = 2, 3 and 4.

The $n$-th central trinomial coefficient is given by

$${n\choose0}_2=\sum_{k=0}^n\frac{n(n-1)\cdots(n-2k+1)}{(k!)^2}=\sum_{k=0}^n{n\choose 2k}{2k\choose k}.$$

Their generating function is

$$1+x+3x^2+7x^3+19x^4+\ldots=\frac1{\sqrt{(1+x)(1-3x)}}.$$

Euler noted the following exemplum memorabile inductionis fallacis ("notable example of fallacious induction"):

$3{n+1\choose0}_2-{n+2\choose0}_2=F_n(F_n+1)$ for $0\leq n\leq 7$,

where $F_n$ is the n-th Fibonacci number. For larger $n$, however, this relationship is incorrect. George Andrews explained this fallacy using the general identity

$$2\sum_{k\in\mathbb Z}\left[{n+1\choose 10k}_2-{n+1\choose 10k+1}_2\right]=F_n(F_n+1).$$

== Applications ==
=== In chess ===
a7 one	b7 three	c7 six	d7 seven	e7 six	f7 three	g7 one
a6 three	b6 one	c6 two	d6 three	e6 two	f6 one	g6 three
a5 six	b5 two	c5 one	d5 one	e5 one	f5 two	g5 six
a4 seven	b4 three	c4 one	d4 white king	e4 one	f4 three	g4 seven
a3 six	b3 two	c3 one	d3 one	e3 one	f3 two	g3 six
a2 three	b2 one	c2 two	d2 three	e2 two	f2 one	g2 three
a1 one	b1 three	c1 six	d1 seven	e1 six	f1 three	g1 one

Number of ways to reach a cell with the minimum number of moves

The triangle corresponds to the number of possible paths that can be taken by the king in a game of chess. The entry in a cell represents the number of different paths (using a minimum number of moves) the king can take to reach the cell.

=== In combinatorics ===
The coefficient of $x^k$ in the expansion of $\left(1+x+x^2\right)^n$ gives the number of different ways to draw $k$ cards from two identical sets of $n$ playing cards each. For example, from two sets of the three cards A, B, C, the different drawings are:

Number of selected cards	Number of options	Options
0	1	
1	3	A, B, C
2	6	AA, AB, AC, BB, BC, CC
3	7	AAB, AAC, ABB, ABC, ACC, BBC, BCC
4	6	AABB, AABC, AACC, ABBC, ABCC, BBCC
5	3	AABBC, AABCC, ABBCC
6	1	AABBCC

For example,

$$6={3\choose 2-3}_2={3\choose 0}{3\choose 2}+{3\choose 1}{2\choose 0}=1\cdot 3+3\cdot 1$$.

In particular, this provides the formula ${24\choose 12-24}_2={24\choose -12}_2={24\choose 12}_2$ for the number of different hands in the card game Doppelkopf.

Alternatively, it is also possible to arrive at this expression by considering the number of ways of choosing $p$ pairs of identical cards from the two sets, which is the binomial coefficient ${n\choose p}$. The remaining $k-2p$ cards can then be chosen in ${n-p\choose k-2p}$ ways, which can be written in terms of the binomial coefficients as

$${n\choose k-n}_2=\sum_{p=\max(0,k-n)}^{\min(n,[k/2])}{n\choose p}{n-p \choose k-2p}$$.

The example above corresponds to the three ways of selecting two cards without pairs of identical cards (AB, AC, BC) and the three ways of selecting a pair of identical cards (AA, BB, CC).
