= Halayudha =

10th-century Indian mathematician

Halāyudha
- Born: c. 10th century AD

Academic work
- Main interests: Sanskrit mathematician
- Notable works: Mṛtasañjīvanī and "Halāyudha trikoņa"

Halāyudha (Sanskrit: हलायुध) wrote the Mṛtasañjīvanī, a commentary on Pingala's Chandaḥśāstra, was an Indian mathematician and poet who lived and worked in the 10th century. The Chandaḥśāstra by the Indian lyricist Piṅgala (3rd or 2nd century BC) somewhat cryptically describes a method of arranging two types of syllables to form metres of various lengths and counting them; as interpreted and elaborated by Halāyudha his "method of pyramidal expansion" (meru-prastāra) for counting metres is equivalent to Pascal's triangle.

== Biography ==
Halayudha originally resided at the Rashtrakuta capital Manyakheta, now located in Karnataka, where he wrote under the patronage of emperor Krishna III. His Kavi-Rahasya eulogizes Krishna III. Later, he migrated to Ujjain in the Paramara kingdom. There, he composed Mṛta-Sañjīvanī in honour of the Paramara king Munja.

== Works ==
Halayudha composed the following works:

- Kavi-Rahasya, a book on poetics
- Mṛta-Sañjīvanī, a commentary on Pingala's Chandaḥ-śāstra
- Abhidhana-ratna-mala, a lexicon
- Halāyudha Kośa, a dictionary

== See also ==
- Indian mathematicians
