= Lozanić's triangle =

Mathematics term

Lozanić's triangle (sometimes called Losanitsch's triangle) is a triangular array related to of Pascal's triangle. It is named after the Serbian chemist Sima Lozanić, who researched it in his investigation into the symmetries exhibited by rows of paraffins (archaic term for alkanes) and isomer types and number of alkanes.

First 9 rows of the triangle (sequence A034851 in the OEIS) with their row sums $2^{n-2} + 2^{\lfloor n/2 \rfloor - 1}$ (OEIS: A005418).

    k     0   1   2   3   4   5   6   7   8       sum
 n
 0        1                                         1
 1        1   1                                     2
 2        1   1   1                                 3
 3        1   2   2   1                             6           
 4        1   2   4   2   1                        10
 5        1   3   6   6   3   1                    20
 6        1   3   9  10   9   3   1                36
 7        1   4  12  19  19  12   4   1            72
 8        1   4  16  28  38  28  16   4   1       136

As in Pascal's triangle, the outer diagonals are all 1s. Most of the enclosed numbers are the sum of the two numbers above. But for even n and odd k one also needs to subtract the number at position $\left ( \frac{n}{2} - 1, \frac{k-1}{2} \right )$ of Pascal's triangle.

The diagonals next to the edge diagonals contain the positive integers in order, but with each integer stated twice (OEIS: A004526).

Moving inwards, the next pair of diagonals contain the "quarter-squares" (OEIS: A002620), or the square numbers and pronic numbers interleaved.

The next pair of diagonals contain the alkane numbers l(6, n) (OEIS: A005993). And the next pair of diagonals contain the alkane numbers l(7, n) (OEIS: A005994), while the next pair has the alkane numbers l(8, n) (OEIS: A005995), then alkane numbers l(9, n) (OEIS: A018210), then l(10, n) (OEIS: A018211), l(11, n) (OEIS: A018212), l(12, n) (OEIS: A018213), etc.

The sums of the diagonals of Lozanić's triangle intermix ${F_{2n - 1} + F_{n + 1}} \over 2$ with ${F_{2n} + F_n} \over 2$ (where F_{x} is the xth Fibonacci number).

The illustrations below show five related number triangles. Entry (n, k) in Pascal's triangle (blue) is the number of binary strings of length n and weight k. The respective entry of Lozanić's triangle (green) counts these strings up to reversal, i.e. treating strings symmetric to each other as equivalent. Another triangle (red, OEIS: A051159) counts the palindromic binary strings. The difference of Pascal's and Lozanić's triangle (dark brown, OEIS: A034852) counts the pairs of chiral strings. (It has applications in the chemical study of catacondensed polygonal systems.)

rows 0...5 with binary strings

details for entries (5, 1) and (5, 2)

rows 0...8 (compare rows 0...16)

all
all	chiral
palindromic	chiral
palindromic	chiral up to reversal
all up to reversal	chiral up to reversal
