= Binomial (polynomial) =

In mathematics, a polynomial with two terms

In algebra, a binomial is a polynomial that is the sum of two terms, each of which is a monomial. It is the simplest kind of a sparse polynomial after the monomials.

A toric ideal is an ideal that is generated by binomials that are difference of monomials; that is, binomials whose two coefficients are 1 and −1. A toric variety is an algebraic variety defined by a toric ideal.

For every admissible monomial ordering, the minimal Gröbner basis of a toric ideal consists only of differences of monomials. (This is an immediate consequence of Buchberger's algorithm that can produce only differences of monomials when starting with differences of monomials.

Similarly, a binomial ideal is an ideal generated by monomials and binomials (that is, the above constraint on the coefficient is released), and the minimal Gröbner basis of a binomial ideal contains only monomials and binomials. Monomials must be included in the definition of a binomial ideal, because, for example, if a binomial ideal contains $y-x$ and $y-2x$, it contains also $(y-x)-(y-2x)=x$.

== Definition ==
A binomial is a polynomial which is the sum of two monomials. A binomial in a single indeterminate (also known as a univariate binomial) can be written in the form

$$a x^m - bx^n ,$$

where a and b are numbers, and m and n are distinct non-negative integers and x is a symbol which is called an indeterminate or, for historical reasons, a variable. In the context of Laurent polynomials, a Laurent binomial, often simply called a binomial, is similarly defined, but the exponents m and n may be negative.

More generally, a binomial may be written as:

$$a\, x_1^{n_1}\dotsb x_i^{n_i} - b\, x_1^{m_1}\dotsb x_i^{m_i}$$

== Examples ==
$$3x - 2x^2$$
$$xy + yx^2$$
$$0.9 x^3 + \pi y^2$$
$$2 x^3 + 7$$
$$11x - 2x^2$$

== Operations on simple binomials ==
- The binomial x^{2} − y^{2}, the difference of two squares, can be factored as the product of two other binomials:

$$x^2 - y^2 = (x - y)(x + y).$$

This is a special case of the more general formula:

$$x^{n+1} - y^{n+1} = (x - y)\sum_{k=0}^{n} x^{k} y^{n-k}.$$

When working over the complex numbers, this can also be extended to:

$$x^2 + y^2 = x^2 - (iy)^2 = (x - iy)(x + iy).$$

- The product of a pair of linear binomials (ax + b) and (cx + d ) is a trinomial:

$$(ax+b)(cx+d) = acx^2+(ad+bc)x+bd.$$

- A binomial raised to the n^{th} power, represented as (x + y)^{n} can be expanded by means of the binomial theorem or, equivalently, using Pascal's triangle. For example, the square (x + y)^{2} of the binomial (x + y) is equal to the sum of the squares of the two terms and twice the product of the terms, that is:

$$(x + y)^2 = x^2 + 2xy + y^2.$$

The numbers (1, 2, 1) appearing as multipliers for the terms in this expansion are the binomial coefficients two rows down from the top of Pascal's triangle. The expansion of the n^{th} power uses the numbers n rows down from the top of the triangle.

- An application of the above formula for the square of a binomial is the "(m, n)-formula" for generating Pythagorean triples:

For m < n, let a = n^{2} − m^{2}, b = 2mn, and c = n^{2} + m^{2}; then a^{2} + b^{2} = c^{2}.

- Binomials that are sums or differences of cubes can be factored into smaller-degree polynomials as follows:

$$x^3 + y^3 = (x + y)(x^2 - xy + y^2)$$
$$x^3 - y^3 = (x - y)(x^2 + xy + y^2)$$

== See also ==
- Completing the square
- Binomial distribution
- List of factorial and binomial topics (which contains a large number of related links)
