= Pascal's triangle =

Triangular array of the binomial coefficients

$\begin{array}{c} 1 \\ 1 \quad 1 \\ 1 \quad 2 \quad 1 \\ 1 \quad 3 \quad 3 \quad 1 \\ 1 \quad 4 \quad 6 \quad 4 \quad 1 \\ 1 \quad 5 \quad 10 \quad 10 \quad 5 \quad 1 \\ 1 \quad 6 \quad 15 \quad 20 \quad 15 \quad 6 \quad 1 \\ 1 \quad 7 \quad 21 \quad 35 \quad 35 \quad 21 \quad 7 \quad 1 \end{array}$
The first eight rows of Pascal's triangle

In mathematics, Pascal's triangle is an infinite triangular array of the binomial coefficients which play a crucial role in probability theory, combinatorics, and algebra. In much of the Western world, it is named after the French mathematician Blaise Pascal, although other mathematicians studied it centuries before him in India, Persia, China, Germany, and Italy.

The rows of Pascal's triangle are conventionally enumerated starting with row $n = 0$ at the top (the 0th row). The entries in each row are numbered from the left beginning with $k = 0$ and are usually staggered relative to the numbers in the adjacent rows. The triangle may be constructed in the following manner: In row 0 (the topmost row), there is a unique nonzero entry 1. Each entry of each subsequent row is constructed by adding the number above and to the left with the number above and to the right, treating blank entries as 0. For example, the initial number of row 1 (or any other row) is 1 (the sum of 0 and 1), whereas the numbers 1 and 3 in row 3 are added to produce the number 4 in row 4.

== Formula ==
In Pascal's triangle, each number is the sum of the two numbers directly above it.

In the $n$th row of Pascal's triangle, the $k$th entry is denoted $\tbinom nk$, pronounced "n choose k" because it describes the number of combinations: the number of ways of choosing $k$ things from among a collection of $n$ things. Row numbering starts at 0, and likewise entries within a row are numbered from 0. For example, the topmost entry is $\tbinom 00 = 1$. With this notation, the construction of the previous paragraph may be written as

$${n \choose k} = {n-1 \choose k-1} + {n-1 \choose k}$$
for any positive integer $n$ and any integer $0 \le k \le n$. This recurrence for the binomial coefficients is known as Pascal's rule. An arbitrary binomial coefficient can be calculated as
$${n \choose k} = \frac{n!}{ k! (n-k)!}.$$

== History ==
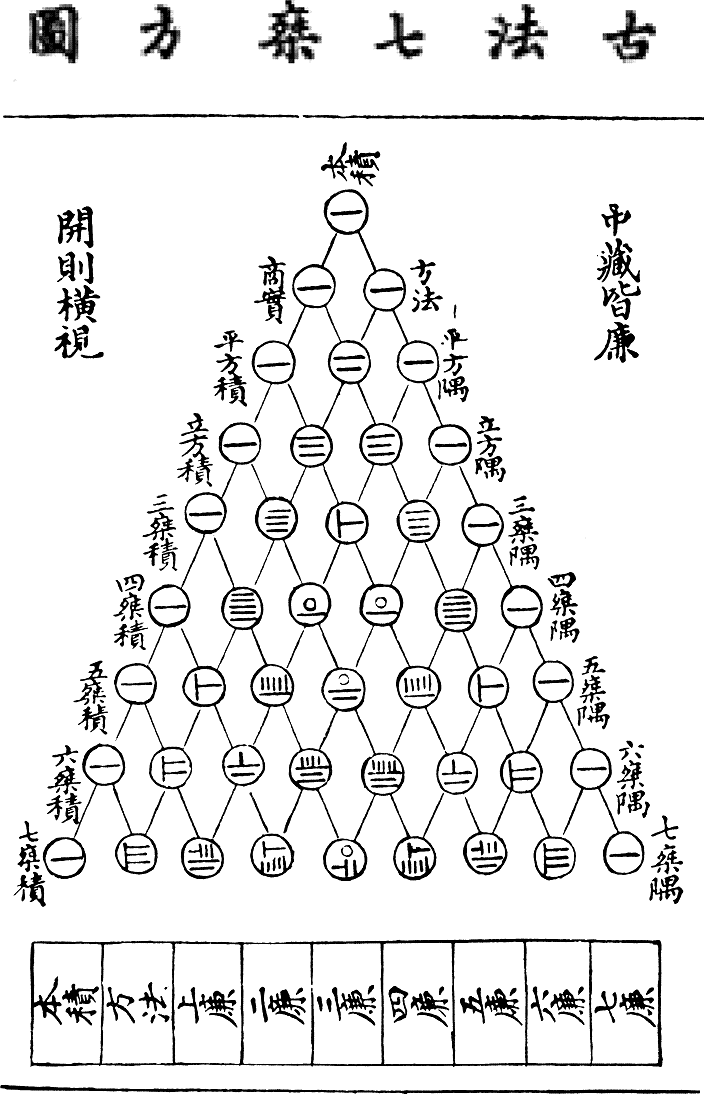
Yang Hui's triangle, depicted using rod numerals, in Jade Mirror of the Four Unknowns (1303) by Zhu Shijie

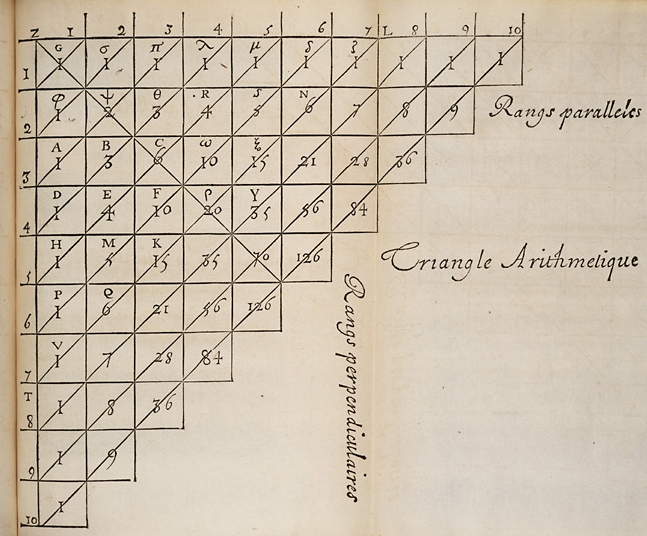
Pascal's version of the triangle

The pattern of numbers that forms Pascal's triangle was known well before Pascal's time. In India, the Chandaḥśāstra by the Ancient Indian poet and mathematician Piṅgala (3rd or 2nd century BC) describes a method of arranging two types of syllables to form metres of various lengths and counting them; as interpreted and elaborated by Pingala's 10th-century commentator Halāyudha his "method of pyramidal expansion" (meru-prastāra) for counting metres is equivalent to Pascal's triangle. The 6th-century Indian mathematician and astronomer Varāhamihira later described a recursive method for computing binomial coefficients that is mathematically equivalent to Pascal's triangle, although arranged in a different orientation.

The Persian mathematician al-Karajī (953–1029), roughly contemporary with Halāyudha, wrote a now-lost book which contained an explicit description of Pascal's triangle. His work was preserved and repeated by the Persian polymath Omar Khayyám (1048–1131) in his Treatise on Demonstration of Problems of Algebra (c. 1070). Khayyám's distinctive contribution was to apply the triangle's binomial coefficients to a general method for extracting nth roots, an application not found in the earlier Indian or Karajian sources. Owing to this innovation and Khayyám's broad influence on later Islamic mathematics, the triangle is known in Iran as Khayyam's triangle (مثلث خیام). Several theorems related to the triangle were known, including the binomial theorem.

Pascal's triangle was known in China during the 11th century through the work of the Chinese mathematician Jia Xian (1010–1070). During the 13th century, Yang Hui (1238–1298) defined the triangle, and it is known as Yang Hui's triangle (杨辉三角; 楊輝三角) in China.

In Europe, Pascal's triangle appeared for the first time in the Arithmetic of Jordanus de Nemore (13th century). The binomial coefficients were calculated by Gersonides during the early 14th century, using the multiplicative formula for them. Petrus Apianus (1495–1552) published the full triangle on the frontispiece of his book on business calculations in 1527. Michael Stifel published a portion of the triangle (from the second to the middle column in each row) in 1544, describing it as a table of figurate numbers. In Italy, Pascal's triangle is referred to as Tartaglia's triangle, named for the Italian algebraist Tartaglia (1500–1577), who published six rows of the triangle in 1556. Gerolamo Cardano also published the triangle as well as the additive and multiplicative rules for constructing it in 1570.

Pascal's Traité du triangle arithmétique (Treatise on Arithmetical Triangle) was published posthumously in 1665. In this, Pascal collected several results then known about the triangle, and employed them to solve problems in probability theory. The triangle was later named for Pascal by Pierre Raymond de Montmort (1708) who called it table de M. Pascal pour les combinaisons (French: Mr. Pascal's table for combinations) and Abraham de Moivre (1730) who called it Triangulum Arithmeticum PASCALIANUM (Latin: Pascal's Arithmetic Triangle), which became the basis of the modern Western name.

== Binomial expansions ==
Visualisation of binomial expansion up to the 4th power

Pascal's triangle determines the coefficients which arise in binomial expansions. For example, in the expansion
$$(x + y)^2 = x^2 + 2xy + y^2 = \mathbf{1} x^2 y^0 + \mathbf{2} x^1 y^1 + \mathbf{1} x^0 y^2,$$
the coefficients are the entries in the second row of Pascal's triangle: $\tbinom 20 = 1$, $\tbinom 21 = 2$, $\tbinom 22 = 1$.

In general, the binomial theorem states that when a binomial like $x + y$ is raised to a positive integer power $n$, the expression expands as
$$(x + y)^n =
\sum_{k=0}^{n} a_{k} x^{n-k} y^{k} =
a_{0} x^n + a_{1} x^{n - 1} y + a_{2} x^{n - 2} y^{2} + \ldots + a_{n - 1} x y^{n-1} + a_{n} y^{n},$$
where the coefficients $a_{k}$ are precisely the numbers in row $n$ of Pascal's triangle:
$$a_k = {n \choose k}.$$

The entire left diagonal of Pascal's triangle corresponds to the coefficient of $x^n$ in these binomial expansions, while the next left diagonal corresponds to the coefficient of $x^{n-1} y$, and so on.

To see how the binomial theorem relates to the simple construction of Pascal's triangle, consider the problem of calculating the coefficients of the expansion of $(x + y)^{n + 1}$ in terms of the corresponding coefficients of $(x + 1)^{n}$, where we set $y = 1$ for simplicity. Suppose then that
$$(x + 1)^{n} = \sum_{k = 0}^{n} a_{k} x^{k}.$$
Now
$$(x+1)^{n+1} = (x+1)(x+1)^n = x(x+1)^n + (x+1)^n = \sum_{i=0}^n a_i x^{i+1} + \sum_{k=0}^n a_k x^k.$$

$\begin{array}{c} \dbinom{0}{0} \\ \dbinom{1}{0} \quad \dbinom{1}{1} \\ \dbinom{2}{0} \quad \dbinom{2}{1} \quad \dbinom{2}{2} \\ \dbinom{3}{0} \quad \dbinom{3}{1} \quad \dbinom{3}{2} \quad \dbinom{3}{3} \\ \dbinom{4}{0} \quad \dbinom{4}{1} \quad \dbinom{4}{2} \quad \dbinom{4}{3} \quad \dbinom{4}{4} \\ \dbinom{5}{0} \quad \dbinom{5}{1} \quad \dbinom{5}{2} \quad \dbinom{5}{3} \quad \dbinom{5}{4} \quad \dbinom{5}{5} \end{array}$
The first six rows of Pascal's triangle as binomial coefficients

The two summations can be reindexed with $k=i+1$ and combined to yield
$$\begin{align}
\sum_{i=0}^{n} a_{i} x^{i+1} + \sum_{k=0}^n a_k x^k &=
\sum_{k=1}^{n+1} a_{k-1} x^{k} + \sum_{k=0}^n a_k x^k \\ [4pt] &=
\sum_{k=1}^{n} a_{k-1} x^{k}  + a_{n}x^{n+1} + a_0x^0 + \sum_{k=1}^n a_k x^k \\[4pt] &=
a_0x^0 + \sum_{k=1}^{n} (a_{k-1} + a_k)x^{k} + a_{n}x^{n+1} \\[4pt] &=
x^0 + \sum_{k=1}^{n} (a_{k-1} + a_k)x^{k} + x^{n+1}.
\end{align}$$

Thus the extreme left and right coefficients remain as 1, and for any given $0 < k < n + 1$, the coefficient of the $x^{k}$ term in the polynomial $(x + 1)^{n + 1}$ is equal to $a_{k-1} + a_{k}$, the sum of the $x^{k-1}$ and $x^{k}$ coefficients in the previous power $(x + 1)^n$. This is indeed the downward-addition rule for constructing Pascal's triangle.

It is not difficult to turn this argument into a proof (by mathematical induction) of the binomial theorem.

Since $(a + b)^{n} = b^{n}(\tfrac{a}{b} + 1 )^{n}$, the coefficients are identical in the expansion of the general case.

An interesting consequence of the binomial theorem is obtained by setting both variables $x = y = 1$, so that
$$\sum_{k = 0}^{n} {n \choose k}
= {n \choose 0} + {n \choose 1} + \cdots + {n \choose n-1} + {n \choose n}
= (1+1)^n = 2^{n}.$$

In other words, the sum of the entries in the $n$th row of Pascal's triangle is the $n$th power of 2. This is equivalent to the statement that the number of subsets of an $n$-element set is $2^n$, as can be seen by observing that each of the $n$ elements may be independently included or excluded from a given subset.

== Combinations ==
A second useful application of Pascal's triangle is in the calculation of combinations. The number of combinations of $n$ items taken $k$ at a time, i.e. the number of subsets of $k$ elements from among $n$ elements, can be found by the equation

$${n \choose k} = \frac{n!}{k!(n-k)!}$$.

(Other common notations for $\tbinom nk$ include $C(n, k)$, $C_k^n$, and ${}_nC_k$.) This is equal to entry $k$ in row $n$ of Pascal's triangle. Rather than performing the multiplicative calculation, one can simply look up the appropriate entry in the triangle (constructed by additions). For example, suppose 3 workers need to be hired from among 7 candidates; then the number of possible hiring choices is 7 choose 3, the entry 3 in row 7 of the above table (taking into consideration the first row is the 0th row), which is $\tbinom{7}{3}=35$.

== Relation to binomial distribution and convolutions ==
When divided by $2^n$, the $n$th row of Pascal's triangle becomes the binomial distribution in the symmetric case where $p = \tfrac{1}{2}$. By the central limit theorem, this distribution approaches the normal distribution as $n$ increases. This can also be seen by applying Stirling's formula to the factorials involved in the formula for combinations.

This is related to the operation of discrete convolution in two ways. First, polynomial multiplication corresponds exactly to discrete convolution, so that repeatedly convolving the sequence $\{ \ldots, 0, 0, 1, 1, 0, 0, \ldots \}$ with itself corresponds to taking powers of $x + 1$, and hence to generating the rows of the triangle. Second, repeatedly convolving the distribution function for a random variable with itself corresponds to calculating the distribution function for a sum of n independent copies of that variable; this is exactly the situation to which the central limit theorem applies, and hence results in the normal distribution in the limit. (The operation of repeatedly taking a convolution of something with itself is called the convolution power.)

== Patterns and properties ==
Pascal's triangle has many properties and contains many patterns of numbers.

Each frame represents a row in Pascal's triangle. Each column of pixels is a number in binary with the least significant bit at the bottom. Light pixels represent 1 and dark pixels 0.

The numbers of compositions of n+1 into k+1 ordered partitions form Pascal's triangle.

=== Rows ===
- The sum of the elements of a single row is twice the sum of the row preceding it. For example, row 0 (the topmost row) has a value of 1, row 1 has a value of 2, row 2 has a value of 4, and so forth. This is because every item in a row produces two items in the next row: one left and one right. The sum of the elements of row $n$ equals to $2^n$.
- Taking the product of the elements in each row, the sequence of products (sequence A001142 in the OEIS) is related to the base of the natural logarithm, e. Specifically, define the sequence $s_{n}$ for all $n \ge 0$ as follows: $s_{n} = \prod_{k = 0}^{n} {n \choose k} = \prod_{k = 0}^{n} \frac{n!}{k!(n-k)!}$
  Then, the ratio of successive row products is
  $$\frac{s_{n+1}}{s_{n}} =
\frac{ \displaystyle (n+1)!^{n+2} \prod_{k = 0}^{n + 1} \frac{1}{k!^2}}{\displaystyle n!^{n+1}\prod_{k=0}^{n}{\frac{1}{k!^2}}} = \frac{(n + 1)^n}{n!}$$
  and the ratio of these ratios is
  $$\frac{s_{n + 1} \cdot s_{n - 1}}{s_{n}^{2}} =
\left( \frac{n + 1}{n} \right)^n, ~ n\ge 1.$$
  The right-hand side of the above equation takes the form of the limit definition of $e$
  $$e =\lim_{n \to \infty} \left( 1 + \frac{1}{n} \right)^{n}.$$
- $\pi$ can be found in Pascal's triangle by use of the Nilakantha infinite series.
  $$\pi = 3 + \sum_{n = 1}^{\infty} (-1)^{n + 1} \frac{{2n + 1 \choose 1}}{{2n + 1 \choose 2}{2n + 2 \choose 2}}$$
- Some of the numbers in Pascal's triangle correlate to numbers in Lozanić's triangle.
- The sum of the squares of the elements of row n equals the middle element of row 2n. For example, 1^{2} + 4^{2} + 6^{2} + 4^{2} + 1^{2} = 70. In general form,
  $$\sum_{k=0}^n {n \choose k}^2 = {2n \choose n}.$$
- In any even row $n=2m$, the middle term minus the term two spots to the left equals a Catalan number, specifically $C_{m-1} = \tbinom{2m}{m} - \tbinom{2m}{m-2}$. For example, in row 4, which is 1, 4, 6, 4, 1, we get the 3rd Catalan number $C_3 = 6-1 = 5$.
- In a row p, where p is a prime number, all the terms in that row except the 1s are divisible by p. This can be proven easily, from the multiplicative formula $\tbinom pk = \tfrac{p!}{k!(p-k)!}$. Since the denominator $k!(p-k)!$ can have no prime factors equal to p, so p remains in the numerator after integer division, making the entire entry a multiple of p.
- Parity: To count odd terms in row n, convert n to binary. Let x be the number of 1s in the binary representation. Then the number of odd terms will be 2^{x}. These numbers are the values in Gould's sequence.
- Every entry in row 2^{n} − 1, n ≥ 0, is odd.
- Polarity: When the elements of a row of Pascal's triangle are alternately added and subtracted together, the result is 0. For example, row 6 is 1, 6, 15, 20, 15, 6, 1, so the formula is 1 − 6 + 15 − 20 + 15 − 6 + 1 = 0.

=== Diagonals ===
Derivation of simplex numbers from a left-justified Pascal's triangle

The diagonals of Pascal's triangle contain the figurate numbers of simplices:

- The diagonals going along the left and right edges contain only 1's.
- The diagonals next to the edge diagonals contain the natural numbers in order. The 1-dimensional simplex numbers increment by 1 as the line segments extend to the next whole number along the number line.
- Moving inwards, the next pair of diagonals contain the triangular numbers in order.
- The next pair of diagonals contain the tetrahedral numbers in order, and the next pair give pentatope numbers.

$$\begin{align}
P_0(n) &= P_d(0) = 1, \\
P_d(n) &= P_d(n-1) + P_{d-1}(n) \\
&= \sum_{i=0}^n P_{d-1}(i) = \sum_{i=0}^d P_i(n-1).
\end{align}$$

The symmetry of the triangle implies that the n^{th} d-dimensional number is equal to the d^{th} n-dimensional number.

An alternative formula that does not involve recursion is
$$P_d(n)=\frac{1}{d!}\prod_{k=0}^{d-1} (n+k) = {n^{(d)}\over d!} = \binom{n+d-1}{d},$$
where n^{(d)} is the rising factorial.

The geometric meaning of a function P_{d} is: P_{d}(1) = 1 for all d. Construct a d-dimensional triangle (a 3-dimensional triangle is a tetrahedron) by placing additional dots below an initial dot, corresponding to P_{d}(1) = 1. Place these dots in a manner analogous to the placement of numbers in Pascal's triangle. To find P_{d}(x), have a total of x dots composing the target shape. P_{d}(x) then equals the total number of dots in the shape. A 0-dimensional triangle is a point and a 1-dimensional triangle is simply a line, and therefore P_{0}(x) = 1 and P_{1}(x) = x, which is the sequence of natural numbers. The number of dots in each layer corresponds to P_{d − 1}(x).

=== Calculating a row or diagonal by itself ===
There are simple algorithms to compute all the elements in a row or diagonal without computing other elements or factorials.

To compute row $n$ with the elements $\tbinom{n}{0}, \tbinom{n}{1}, \ldots, \tbinom{n}{n}$, begin with $\tbinom{n}{0}=1$. For each subsequent element, the value is determined by multiplying the previous value by a fraction with slowly changing numerator and denominator:

$${n\choose k}= {n\choose k-1}\times \frac{n+1-k}{k}.$$

For example, to calculate row 5, the fractions are $\tfrac{5}{1}$, $\tfrac{4}{2}$, $\tfrac{3}{3}$, $\tfrac{2}{4}$ and $\tfrac{1}{5}$, and hence the elements are $\tbinom{5}{0}=1$, $\tbinom{5}{1}=1\times\tfrac{5}{1}=5$, $\tbinom{5}{2}=5\times\tfrac{4}{2}=10$, etc. (The remaining elements are most easily obtained by symmetry.)

To compute the diagonal containing the elements $\tbinom{n}{0}, \tbinom{n+1}{1}, \tbinom{n+2}{2},\ldots,$ begin again with $\tbinom{n}{0} = 1$ and obtain subsequent elements by multiplication by certain fractions:

$${n+k\choose k}= {n+k-1\choose k-1}\times \frac{n+k}{k}.$$

For example, to calculate the diagonal beginning at $\tbinom{5}{0}$, the fractions are $\tfrac{6}{1}, \tfrac{7}{2}, \tfrac{8}{3}, \ldots$, and the elements are $\tbinom{5}{0}=1, \tbinom{6}{1}=1 \times \tfrac{6}{1}=6, \tbinom{7}{2}=6\times\tfrac{7}{2}=21$, etc. By symmetry, these elements are equal to $\tbinom{5}{5}, \tbinom{6}{5}, \tbinom{7}{5}$, etc.

Fibonacci sequence in Pascal's triangle

=== Overall patterns and properties ===
A level-4 approximation to a Sierpiński triangle obtained by shading the first 32 rows of a Pascal triangle white if the binomial coefficient is even and black if it is odd.

- The pattern obtained by coloring only the odd numbers in Pascal's triangle closely resembles the fractal known as the Sierpiński triangle. This resemblance becomes increasingly accurate as more rows are considered; in the limit, as the number of rows approaches infinity, the resulting pattern is the Sierpiński triangle, assuming a fixed perimeter. More generally, numbers could be colored differently according to whether or not they are multiples of 3, 4, etc.; this results in other similar patterns.
  As the proportion of black numbers tends to zero with increasing n, a corollary is that the proportion of odd binomial coefficients tends to zero as n tends to infinity.

a4 white rook	b4 one	c4 one	d4 one
a3 one	b3 two	c3 three	d3 four
a2 one	b2 three	c2 six	10
a1 one	b1 four	10	20

Pascal's triangle overlaid on a grid gives the number of distinct paths to each square, assuming only rightward and downward steps to an adjacent square are considered.

- In a triangular portion of a grid (as in the images below), the number of shortest grid paths from a given node to the top node of the triangle is the corresponding entry in Pascal's triangle. For example there are four shortest paths to the top from the node with value 4. On a Plinko game board shaped like a triangle, this distribution should give the probabilities of winning the various prizes.

- If the rows of Pascal's triangle are left-justified, the diagonal bands (colour-coded below) sum to the Fibonacci numbers.

1
1	1
1	2	1
1	3	3	1
1	4	6	4	1
1	5	10	10	5	1
1	6	15	20	15	6	1
1	7	21	35	35	21	7	1

=== Construction as matrix exponential ===
$$\begin{align}
\exp\begin{pmatrix}
. & . & . & . & . \\
1 & . & . & . & . \\
. & 2 & . & . & . \\
. & . & 3 & . & . \\
. & . & . & 4 & .
\end{pmatrix} &=
\begin{pmatrix}
1 & . & . & . & . \\
1 & 1 & . & . & . \\
1 & 2 & 1 & . & . \\
1 & 3 & 3 & 1 & . \\
1 & 4 & 6 & 4 & 1
\end{pmatrix}\\
e^{\text{counting}} &= \text{binomial}
\end{align}$$
Binomial matrix as matrix exponential. All the dots represent 0.

Due to its simple construction by factorials, a very basic representation of Pascal's triangle in terms of the matrix exponential can be given: Pascal's triangle is the exponential of the matrix which has the sequence 1, 2, 3, 4, ... on its sub-diagonal and zero everywhere else.

=== Construction of Clifford algebra using simplices ===
Labelling the elements of each n-simplex matches the basis elements of Clifford algebra used as forms in Geometric Algebra rather than matrices. Recognising the geometric operations, such as rotations, allows the algebra operations to be discovered. Just as each row, n, starting at 0, of Pascal's triangle corresponds to an (n-1)-simplex, as described below, it also defines the number of named basis forms in n dimensional Geometric algebra. The binomial theorem can be used to prove the geometric relationship provided by Pascal's triangle. This same proof could be applied to simplices except that the first column of all 1's must be ignored whereas in the algebra these correspond to the real numbers, $\R$, with basis 1.

=== Relation to geometry of polytopes ===
Each row of Pascal's triangle gives the number of elements (such as edges and corners) of each dimension in a corresponding simplex (such as a triangle or tetrahedron). In particular, for k > 0, the kth entry in the nth row is the number of (k − 1)-dimensional elements in a (n − 1)-dimensional simplex. For example, a triangle (the 2-dimensional simplex) one 2-dimensional element (itself), three 1-dimensional elements (lines, or edges), and three 0-dimensional elements (vertices, or corners); this corresponds to the third row 1, 3, 3, 1 of Pascal's triangle. This fact can be explained by combining Pascal's rule for generating the triangle with the geometric construction of simplices: each simplex is formed from a simplex of one lower dimension by the addition of a new vertex, outside the space in which the lower-dimensional simplex lies. Then each d-dimensional element in the smaller simplex remains a d-dimensional element of the higher simplex, and each (d − 1)-dimensional element when joined to the new vertex forms a new d-dimensional element of the higher simplex.

A similar pattern is observed relating to squares, as opposed to triangles. To find the pattern, one must construct an analog to Pascal's triangle, whose entries are the coefficients of (x + 2)^{row number}, instead of (x + 1)^{row number}. There are a couple ways to do this. The simpler is to begin with row 0 = 1 and row 1 = 1, 2. Proceed to construct the analog triangles according to the following rule:

$${n \choose k} = 2\times{n-1 \choose k-1} + {n-1 \choose k}.$$

That is, choose a pair of numbers according to the rules of Pascal's triangle, but double the one on the left before adding. This results in:

$$\begin{matrix}
\text{  1} \\
\text{  1}   \quad \text{  2} \\
\text{  1}   \quad \text{  4}   \quad \text{  4} \\
\text{  1}   \quad\text{  6}   \quad   \text{ 12}   \quad\text{  8} \\
\text{  1}   \quad\text{  8}   \quad   \text{ 24}   \quad  \text{ 32}   \quad  \text{ 16} \\
\text{  1}   \quad   \text{ 10}   \quad  \text{ 40}   \quad  \text{ 80}   \quad  \text{ 80}    \quad  \text{ 32} \\
\text{  1}   \quad  \text{ 12}   \quad  \text{ 60}   \quad  160   \quad 240  \quad  192   \quad   \text{ 64} \\
\text{  1}   \quad  \text{ 14}   \quad  \text{ 84}   \quad  280  \quad  560  \quad  672   \quad  448   \quad   128
\end{matrix}$$

The other way of producing this triangle is to start with Pascal's triangle and multiply each entry by 2^{k}, where k is the position in the row of the given number. For example, the 2nd value in row 4 of Pascal's triangle is 6 (the slope of 1s corresponds to the zeroth entry in each row). To get the value that resides in the corresponding position in the analog triangle, multiply 6 by 2^{position number} = 6 × 2^{2} = 6 × 4 = 24. Now that the analog triangle has been constructed, the number of elements of any dimension that compose an arbitrarily dimensioned cube (called a hypercube) can be read from the table in a way analogous to Pascal's triangle. For example, the number of 2-dimensional elements in a 2-dimensional cube (a square) is one, the number of 1-dimensional elements (sides, or lines) is 4, and the number of 0-dimensional elements (points, or vertices) is 4. This matches the 2nd row of the table (1, 4, 4). A cube has 1 cube, 6 faces, 12 edges, and 8 vertices, which corresponds to the next line of the analog triangle (1, 6, 12, 8). This pattern continues indefinitely.

To understand why this pattern exists, first recognize that the construction of an n-cube from an (n − 1)-cube is done by simply duplicating the original figure and displacing it some distance (for a regular n-cube, the edge length) orthogonal to the space of the original figure, then connecting each vertex of the new figure to its corresponding vertex of the original. This initial duplication process is the reason why, to enumerate the dimensional elements of an n-cube, one must double the first of a pair of numbers in a row of this analog of Pascal's triangle before summing to yield the number below. The initial doubling thus yields the number of "original" elements to be found in the next higher n-cube and, as before, new elements are built upon those of one fewer dimension (edges upon vertices, faces upon edges, etc.). Again, the last number of a row represents the number of new vertices to be added to generate the next higher n-cube.

In this triangle, the sum of the elements of row m is equal to 3^{m}. Again, to use the elements of row 4 as an example: 1 + 8 + 24 + 32 + 16 = 81, which is equal to $3^4 = 81$.

==== Counting vertices in a cube by distance ====
Each row of Pascal's triangle gives the number of vertices at each distance from a fixed vertex in an n-dimensional cube. For example, in three dimensions, the third row (1 3 3 1) corresponds to the usual three-dimensional cube: fixing a vertex V, there is one vertex at distance 0 from V (that is, V itself), three vertices at distance 1, three vertices at distance √2 and one vertex at distance √3 (the vertex opposite V). The second row corresponds to a square, while larger-numbered rows correspond to hypercubes in each dimension.

=== Fourier transform of sin(x)^{n+1}/x ===
As stated previously, the coefficients of (x + 1)^{n} are the nth row of the triangle. Now the coefficients of (x − 1)^{n} are the same, except that the sign alternates from +1 to −1 and back again. After suitable normalization, the same pattern of numbers occurs in the Fourier transform of sin(x)^{n+1}/x. More precisely: if n is even, take the real part of the transform, and if n is odd, take the imaginary part. Then the result is a step function, whose values (suitably normalized) are given by the nth row of the triangle with alternating signs. For example, the values of the step function that results from:

$$\mathfrak{Re}\left(\text{Fourier} \left[  \frac{\sin(x)^5}{x}   \right]\right)$$

compose the 4th row of the triangle, with alternating signs. This is a generalization of the following basic result (often used in electrical engineering):

$$\mathfrak{Re}\left(\text{Fourier} \left[ \frac{\sin(x)^1}{x}\right] \right)$$

is the boxcar function. The corresponding row of the triangle is row 0, which consists of just the number 1.

If n is congruent to 2 or to 3 mod 4, then the signs start with −1. In fact, the sequence of the (normalized) first terms corresponds to the powers of i, which cycle around the intersection of the axes with the unit circle in the complex plane:
$$+i,-1,-i,+1,+i,\ldots$$

== Extensions ==
=== Upwards ===
Pascal's triangle may be extended upwards, above the 1 at the apex, preserving the additive property, but there is more than one way to do so.

=== To higher dimensions ===
Pascal's triangle has higher dimensional generalizations. The three-dimensional version is known as Pascal's pyramid or Pascal's tetrahedron, while the general versions are known as Pascal's simplices.

=== To complex numbers ===
When the factorial function is defined as $z! = \Gamma(z + 1)$, Pascal's triangle can be extended beyond the integers to $\Complex$, since $\Gamma(z + 1)$ is meromorphic to the entire complex plane.

=== To arbitrary bases ===
Isaac Newton once observed that the first five rows of Pascal's triangle, when read as the digits of an integer, are the corresponding powers of eleven. He claimed without proof that subsequent rows also generate powers of eleven. In 1964, Robert L. Morton presented the more generalized argument that each row $n$ can be read as a radix $a$ numeral, where $\lim_{n \to \infty} 11^{n}_{a}$ is the hypothetical terminal row, or limit, of the triangle, and the rows are its partial products. He proved the entries of row $n$, when interpreted directly as a place-value numeral, correspond to the binomial expansion of $(a + 1)^n = 11^{n}_{a}$. More rigorous proofs have since been developed. To better understand the principle behind this interpretation, here are some things to recall about binomials:

- A radix $a$ numeral in positional notation (e.g. $14641_{a}$) is a univariate polynomial in the variable $a$, where the degree of the variable of the $i$th term (starting with $i = 0$) is $i$. For example, $14641_{a} = 1 \cdot a^{4} + 4 \cdot a^{3} + 6 \cdot a^{2} + 4 \cdot a^{1} + 1 \cdot a^{0}$.
- A row corresponds to the binomial expansion of $(a + b)^{n}$. The variable $b$ can be eliminated from the expansion by setting $b = 1$. The expansion now typifies the expanded form of a radix $a$ numeral, as demonstrated above. Thus, when the entries of the row are concatenated and read in radix $a$ they form the numerical equivalent of $(a + 1)^{n} = 11^{n}_{a}$. If $c = a + 1$ for $c < 0$, then the theorem holds for $a \bmod 2c$, with $a$ congruent to $\{c - 1, -(c + 1)\}$, and with odd values of $n$ yielding negative row products.

By setting the row's radix (the variable $a$) equal to one and ten, row $n$ becomes the product $11^{n}_{1} = 2^{n}$ and $11^{n}_{10} = 11^{n}$, respectively. To illustrate, consider $a = n$, which yields the row product $\textstyle n^n \left( 1 + \frac{1}{n} \right)^{n} = 11^{n}_{n}$. The numeric representation of $11^{n}_{n}$ is formed by concatenating the entries of row $n$. The twelfth row denotes the product:

$$11^{12}_{12} = 1:10:56:164:353:560:650:560:353:164:56:10:1_{12} = 27433a9699701_{12}$$

with compound digits (delimited by ":") in radix twelve. The digits from $k = n - 1$ through $k = 1$ are compound because these row entries compute to values greater than or equal to twelve. To normalize the numeral, simply carry the first compound entry's prefix, that is, remove the prefix of the coefficient $\textstyle {n \choose n - 1}$ from its leftmost digit up to, but excluding, its rightmost digit, and use radix-twelve arithmetic to sum the removed prefix with the entry on its immediate left, then repeat this process, proceeding leftward, until the leftmost entry is reached. In this particular example, the normalized string ends with $01$ for all $n$. The leftmost digit is $2$ for $n > 2$, which is obtained by carrying the $1$ of $10_{n}$ at entry $k = 1$. It follows that the length of the normalized value of $11^{n}_{n}$ is equal to the row length, $n + 1$. The integral part of $1.1^{n}_{n}$ contains exactly one digit because $n$ (the number of places to the left the decimal has moved) is one less than the row length. Below is the normalized value of $1.1^{1234}_{1234}$. Compound digits remain in the value because they are radix $1234$ residues represented in radix ten:

$$1.1^{1234}_{1234} = 2.885:2:35:977:696:\overbrace{\ldots}^\text{1227 digits}:0:1_{1234} = 2.717181235\ldots_{10}$$

== See also ==
- Bean machine, Francis Galton's "quincunx"
- Bell triangle
- Bernoulli's triangle
- Binomial expansion
- Cellular automata
- Euler triangle
- Floyd's triangle
- Gaussian binomial coefficient
- Hockey-stick identity
- Leibniz harmonic triangle
- Multiplicities of entries in Pascal's triangle (Singmaster's conjecture)
- Pascal matrix
- Pascal's pyramid
- Pascal's simplex
- Proton NMR, one application of Pascal's triangle
- Star of David theorem
- Trinomial expansion
- Trinomial triangle
- Polynomials calculating sums of powers of arithmetic progressions
