= Binomial theorem =

Algebraic expansion of powers of a binomial

$\begin{array}{c} 1 \\ 1 \quad 1 \\ 1 \quad 2 \quad 1 \\ 1 \quad 3 \quad 3 \quad 1 \\ 1 \quad 4 \quad 6 \quad 4 \quad 1 \\ 1 \quad 5 \quad 10 \quad 10 \quad 5 \quad 1 \\ 1 \quad 6 \quad 15 \quad 20 \quad 15 \quad 6 \quad 1 \\ 1 \quad 7 \quad 21 \quad 35 \quad 35 \quad 21 \quad 7 \quad 1 \end{array}$
The binomial coefficient $\tbinom{n}{k}$ appears as the kth entry in the nth row of Pascal's triangle (where the top is the 0th row $\tbinom{0}{0}$). Each entry is the sum of the two above it.

In elementary algebra, the binomial theorem (or binomial expansion) describes the algebraic expansion of powers of a binomial. According to the theorem, the power $\textstyle (x+y)^n$ expands into a polynomial with terms of the form $\textstyle ax^ky^m$, where the exponents $k$ and $m$ are nonnegative integers satisfying $k + m = n$ and the coefficient $a$ of each term is a specific positive integer depending on $n$ and $k$. For example, for $n = 4$,
$$(x+y)^4 = x^4 + 4 x^3y + 6 x^2 y^2 + 4 x y^3 + y^4.$$

The coefficient $a$ in each term $\textstyle ax^ky^m$ is known as the binomial coefficient $\tbinom nk$ or $\tbinom{n}{m}$ (the two have the same value). These coefficients for varying $n$ and $k$ can be arranged to form Pascal's triangle. These numbers also occur in combinatorics, where $\tbinom nk$ gives the number of different combinations (i.e. subsets) of $k$ elements that can be chosen from an $n$-element set. Therefore $\tbinom nk$ is usually pronounced as "$n$ choose $k$".

== Statement ==
According to the theorem, the expansion of any nonnegative integer power n of the binomial x + y is a sum of the form
$$(x+y)^n = {\binom{n}{0}}x^n y^0 + {\binom{n}{1}}x^{n-1} y^1 + {\binom{n}{2}}x^{n-2} y^2 + \cdots + {\binom{n}{n}}x^0 y^n,$$
where each $\tbinom nk$ is a positive integer known as a binomial coefficient, defined as

$$\binom nk = \frac{n!}{k!\,(n-k)!} = \frac{n(n-1)(n-2)\cdots(n-k + 1)}{k(k-1)(k-2)\cdots2\cdot1}.$$

This formula is also referred to as the binomial formula or the binomial identity. Using summation notation, it can be written more concisely as
$$(x+y)^n = \sum_{k=0}^n {\binom{n}{k}}x^{n-k}y^k = \sum_{k=0}^n {\binom{n}{k}}x^{k}y^{n-k}.$$

The final expression follows from the previous one by the symmetry of x and y in the first expression, and by comparison it follows that the sequence of binomial coefficients in the formula is symmetric, $\binom nk = \binom n{n-k}.$ (Note: $(x+y)^n = \sum_{k=0}^n {\binom{n}{k}}x^{n-k}y^k = \sum_{k'=0}^n {\binom{n}{k'}}x^{k'}y^{n-k'}$, and the coefficient of the same monomial in the left and right-hand side expressions of the 2nd equality must be same; for $x^{n-k}y^k = x^{k'}y^{n-k'}$ so $k' = n - k$, $\binom{n}{k} = \binom{n}{k'} = \binom{n}{n-k}$.)

A simple variant of the binomial formula is obtained by substituting 1 for y, so that it involves only a single variable. In this form, the formula reads
$$\begin{align}
(x+1)^n
&= {\binom{n}{0}}x^0 + {\binom{n}{1}}x^1 + {\binom{n}{2}}x^2 + \cdots + {\binom{n}{n}}x^n \\[4mu]
&= \sum_{k=0}^n {\binom{n}{k}}x^k. \vphantom{\Bigg)}
\end{align}$$

== Examples ==
Example of binomial expansion using Pascal's triangle

The first few cases of the binomial theorem are:
$$\begin{align}
(x+y)^0 & = 1, \\[2mu]
(x+y)^1 & = x + y, \\[2mu]
(x+y)^2 & = x^2 + 2xy + y^2, \\[2mu]
(x+y)^3 & = x^3 + 3x^2y + 3xy^2 + y^3, \\[2mu]
(x+y)^4 & = x^4 + 4x^3y + 6x^2y^2 + 4xy^3 + y^4,
\end{align}$$
In general, for the expansion of (x + y)^{n} on the right side in the nth row (numbered so that the top row is the 0th row):

- the exponents of x in the terms are n, n − 1, ..., 2, 1, 0 (the last term implicitly contains x^{0} = 1);
- the exponents of y in the terms are 0, 1, 2, ..., n − 1, n (the first term implicitly contains y^{0} = 1);
- the coefficients form the nth row of Pascal's triangle;
- before combining like terms, there are 2^{n} terms x^{i}y^{j} in the expansion (not shown);
- after combining like terms, there are n + 1 terms, and their coefficients sum to 2^{n}.

An example illustrating the last two points:
$$\begin{align}
(x+y)^3 & = xxx + xxy + xyx + xyy + yxx + yxy + yyx + yyy & (2^3 \text{ terms}) \\
& = x^3 + 3x^2y + 3xy^2 + y^3 & (3 + 1 \text{ terms})
\end{align}$$
with $1 + 3 + 3 + 1 = 2^3$.

A simple example with a specific positive value of y:
$$\begin{align}
(x+2)^3 &= x^3 + 3x^2(2) + 3x(2)^2 + 2^3 \\
&= x^3 + 6x^2 + 12x + 8.
\end{align}$$

A simple example with a specific negative value of y:
$$\begin{align}
(x-2)^3 &= x^3 - 3x^2(2) + 3x(2)^2 - 2^3 \\
&= x^3 - 6x^2 + 12x - 8.
\end{align}$$

=== Geometric explanation ===
Visualisation of binomial expansion up to the 4th power

For positive values of a and b, the binomial theorem with n = 2 is the geometrically evident fact that a square of side a + b can be cut into a square of side a, a square of side b, and two rectangles with sides a and b. With n = 3, the theorem states that a cube of side a + b can be cut into a cube of side a, a cube of side b, three a × a × b rectangular boxes, and three a × b × b rectangular boxes.

In calculus, this picture also gives a geometric proof of the derivative $(x^n)'=nx^{n-1}:$ if one sets $a=x$ and $b=\Delta x,$ interpreting b as an infinitesimal change in a, then this picture shows the infinitesimal change in the volume of an n-dimensional hypercube, $(x+\Delta x)^n,$ where the coefficient of the linear term (in $\Delta x$) is $nx^{n-1},$ the area of the n faces, each of dimension n − 1:
$$(x+\Delta x)^n = x^n + nx^{n-1}\Delta x + \binom{n}{2}x^{n-2}(\Delta x)^2 + \cdots.$$
Substituting this into the definition of the derivative via a difference quotient and taking limits means that the higher order terms, $(\Delta x)^2$ and higher, become negligible, and yields the formula $(x^n)'=nx^{n-1},$ interpreted as "the infinitesimal rate of change in volume of an n-cube as side length varies is the area of n of its (n − 1)-dimensional faces". If one integrates this picture, which corresponds to applying the fundamental theorem of calculus, one obtains Cavalieri's quadrature formula, the integral $\textstyle{\int x^{n-1}\,dx = \tfrac{1}{n} x^n}$ – see proof of Cavalieri's quadrature formula for details.

== Binomial coefficients ==
The coefficients that appear in the binomial expansion are called binomial coefficients. These are usually written $\tbinom{n}{k},$ and pronounced "n choose k".

=== Formulas ===
The coefficient of x^{n−k}y^{k} is given by the formula
$$\binom{n}{k} = \frac{n!}{k! \; (n-k)!},$$
which is defined in terms of the factorial function n!. Equivalently, this formula can be written
$$\binom{n}{k} = \frac{n (n-1) \cdots (n-k+1)}{k (k-1) \cdots 1} = \prod_{\ell=1}^k \frac{n-\ell+1}{\ell} = \prod_{\ell=0}^{k-1} \frac{n-\ell}{k - \ell}$$
with k factors in both the numerator and denominator of the fraction. Although this formula involves a fraction, the binomial coefficient $\tbinom{n}{k}$ is actually an integer.

=== Combinatorial interpretation ===
The binomial coefficient $\tbinom nk$ can be interpreted as the number of ways to choose k elements from an n-element set (a combination). This is related to binomials for the following reason: if we write (x + y)^{n} as a product
$$(x+y)(x+y)(x+y)\cdots(x+y),$$
then, according to the distributive law, there will be one term in the expansion for each choice of either x or y from each of the binomials of the product. For example, there will only be one term x^{n}, corresponding to choosing x from each binomial. However, there will be several terms of the form x^{n−2}y^{2}, one for each way of choosing exactly two binomials to contribute a y. Therefore, after combining like terms, the coefficient of x^{n−2}y^{2} will be equal to the number of ways to choose exactly 2 elements from an n-element set.

== Proofs ==
=== Combinatorial proof ===
Expanding (x + y)^{n} yields the sum of the 2^{n} products of the form e_{1}e_{2} ... e_{n} where each e_{i} is x or y. Rearranging factors shows that each product equals x^{n−k}y^{k} for some k between 0 and n. For a given k, the following are proved equal in succession:

- the number of terms equal to x^{n−k}y^{k} in the expansion
- the number of n-character x,y strings having y in exactly k positions
- the number of k-element subsets of {1, 2, ..., n}
- $\tbinom{n}{k},$ either by definition, or by a short combinatorial argument if one is defining $\tbinom{n}{k}$ as $\tfrac{n!}{k! (n-k)!}.$

This proves the binomial theorem.

==== Example ====
The coefficient of xy^{2} in
$$\begin{align}
(x+y)^3 &= (x+y)(x+y)(x+y) \\
&= xxx + xxy + xyx + \underline{xyy} + yxx + \underline{yxy} + \underline{yyx} + yyy \\
&= x^3 + 3x^2y + \underline{3xy^2} + y^3
\end{align}$$
equals $\tbinom{3}{2}=3$ because there are three x,y strings of length 3 with exactly two y's, namely,
$$xyy, \; yxy, \; yyx,$$
corresponding to the three 2-element subsets of {1, 2, 3}, namely,
$$\{2,3\},\;\{1,3\},\;\{1,2\},$$
where each subset specifies the positions of the y in a corresponding string.

=== Inductive proof ===
Induction yields another proof of the binomial theorem. When n = 0, both sides equal 1, since x^{0} = 1 and $\tbinom{0}{0}=1.$ Now suppose that the equality holds for a given n; we will prove it for n + 1. For j, k ≥ 0, let [f(x, y)]_{j,k} denote the coefficient of x^{j}y^{k} in the polynomial f(x, y). By the inductive hypothesis, (x + y)^{n} is a polynomial in x and y such that [(x + y)^{n}]_{j,k} is $\tbinom{n}{k}$ if j + k = n, and 0 otherwise. The identity
$$(x+y)^{n+1} = x(x+y)^n + y(x+y)^n$$
shows that (x + y)^{n+1} is also a polynomial in x and y, and
$$[(x+y)^{n+1}]_{j,k} = [(x+y)^n]_{j-1,k} + [(x+y)^n]_{j,k-1},$$
since if j + k = n + 1, then (j − 1) + k = n and j + (k − 1) = n. Now, the right hand side is
$$\binom{n}{k} + \binom{n}{k-1} = \binom{n+1}{k},$$
by Pascal's identity. On the other hand, if j + k ≠ n + 1, then (j – 1) + k ≠ n and j + (k – 1) ≠ n, so we get 0 + 0 = 0. Thus
$$(x+y)^{n+1} = \sum_{k=0}^{n+1} \binom{n+1}{k} x^{n+1-k} y^k,$$
which is the inductive hypothesis with n + 1 substituted for n and so completes the inductive step.

== Generalizations ==
=== Generalized binomial theorem ===
The standard binomial theorem, as discussed above, is concerned with $(x+y)^n$ where the exponent $n$ is a nonnegative integer. The generalized binomial theorem allows for non-integer, negative, or even complex exponents, at the expense of replacing the finite sum by an infinite series.

In order to do this, one needs to give meaning to binomial coefficients with an arbitrary upper index, which cannot be done using the usual formula with factorials. However, for an arbitrary number r, one can define
$${\binom{r}{k}}=\frac{r(r-1) \cdots (r-k+1)}{k!} =\frac{r^{\underline{k}}}{k!},$$
where the last equation introduces modern notation for the falling factorial. This agrees with the usual definitions when r is a nonnegative integer. Then, if x and y are real numbers with |x| > |y|, (Note: This is to guarantee convergence. Depending on r, the series may also converge sometimes when |x| = |y|.) and r is any complex number, one has
$$\begin{align}
(x+y)^r & =\sum_{k=0}^\infty {\binom{r}{k}} x^{r-k} y^k \\
&= x^r + r x^{r-1} y + \frac{r(r-1)}{2!} x^{r-2} y^2 + \frac{r(r-1)(r-2)}{3!} x^{r-3} y^3 + \cdots.
\end{align}$$

When r is a nonnegative integer, the binomial coefficients for k > r are zero, so this equation reduces to the usual binomial theorem, and there are at most r + 1 nonzero terms. For other values of r, the series has infinitely many nonzero terms.

For example, r = 1/2 gives the following series for the square root:
$$\sqrt{1+x} = 1 + \frac{1}{2}x - \frac{1}{8}x^2 + \frac{1}{16}x^3 - \frac{5}{128}x^4 + \frac{7}{256}x^5 - \cdots.$$

With r = −1, the generalized binomial series becomes:
$$(1+x)^{-1} = \frac{1}{1+x} = 1 - x + x^2 - x^3 + x^4 - x^5 + \cdots.$$
which is the geometric series sum formula for the convergent case |x| < 1, whose common ratio is −x.

More generally, with r = −s, we have for |x| < 1:
$$\frac{1}{(1+x)^s} = \sum_{k=0}^\infty {\binom{-s}{k}} x^k = \sum_{k=0}^\infty {\binom{s+k-1}{k}} (-1)^k x^k.$$

So, for instance, when s = 1/2,
$$\frac{1}{\sqrt{1+x}} = 1 - \frac{1}{2}x + \frac{3}{8}x^2 - \frac{5}{16}x^3 + \frac{35}{128}x^4 - \frac{63}{256}x^5 + \cdots.$$

Replacing x with -x yields:
$$\frac{1}{(1-x)^s} = \sum_{k=0}^\infty {\binom{s+k-1}{k}} (-1)^k (-x)^k = \sum_{k=0}^\infty {\binom{s+k-1}{k}} x^k.$$

So, for instance, when s = 1/2, we have for |x| < 1:
$$\frac{1}{\sqrt{1-x}} = 1 + \frac{1}{2}x + \frac{3}{8}x^2 + \frac{5}{16}x^3 + \frac{35}{128}x^4 + \frac{63}{256}x^5 + \cdots.$$

=== Further generalizations ===
The generalized binomial theorem can be extended to the case where x and y are complex numbers. For this version, one should again assume |x| > |y| and define the powers of x + y and x using a holomorphic branch of log defined on an open disk of radius |x| centered at x. The generalized binomial theorem is valid also for elements x and y of a Banach algebra as long as xy = yx, and x is invertible, and ‖y/x‖ < 1.

A version of the binomial theorem is valid for the following Pochhammer symbol-like family of polynomials: for a given real constant c, define $x^{(0)} = 1$ and
$$x^{(n)} = \prod_{k=1}^{n}[x+(k-1)c]$$
for $n > 0.$ Then
$$(a + b)^{(n)} = \sum_{k=0}^{n}\binom{n}{k}a^{(n-k)}b^{(k)}.$$
The case c = 0 recovers the usual binomial theorem.

More generally, a sequence $\{p_n\}_{n=0}^\infty$ of polynomials is said to be of binomial type if

- $\deg p_n = n$ for all $n$,
- $p_0(0) = 1$, and
- $p_n(x+y) = \sum_{k=0}^n \binom{n}{k} p_k(x) p_{n-k}(y)$ for all $x$, $y$, and $n$.

An operator $Q$ on the space of polynomials is said to be the basis operator of the sequence $\{p_n\}_{n=0}^\infty$ if $Qp_0 = 0$ and $Q p_n = n p_{n-1}$ for all $n \geqslant 1$. A sequence $\{p_n\}_{n=0}^\infty$ is binomial if and only if its basis operator is a Delta operator. Writing $E^a$ for the shift by $a$ operator, the Delta operators corresponding to the above "Pochhammer" families of polynomials are the backward difference $I - E^{-c}$ for $c>0$, the ordinary derivative for $c=0$, and the forward difference $E^{-c} - I$ for $c<0$.

=== Multinomial theorem ===
The binomial theorem can be generalized to include powers of sums with more than two terms. The general version is

$$(x_1 + x_2 + \cdots + x_m)^n = \sum_{k_1+k_2+\cdots +k_m = n} \binom{n}{k_1, k_2, \ldots, k_m} x_1^{k_1} x_2^{k_2} \cdots x_m^{k_m},$$

where the summation is taken over all sequences of nonnegative integer indices k_{1} through k_{m} such that the sum of all k_{i} is n. (For each term in the expansion, the exponents must add up to n). The coefficients $\tbinom{n}{k_1,\cdots,k_m}$ are known as multinomial coefficients, and can be computed by the formula
$$\binom{n}{k_1, k_2, \ldots, k_m} = \frac{n!}{k_1! \cdot k_2! \cdots k_m!}.$$

Combinatorially, the multinomial coefficient $\tbinom{n}{k_1,\cdots,k_m}$ counts the number of different ways to partition an n-element set into disjoint subsets of sizes k_{1}, ..., k_{m}.

=== Multi-binomial theorem ===
When working in more dimensions, it is often useful to deal with products of binomial expressions. By the binomial theorem this is equal to
$$(x_1+y_1)^{n_1}\dotsm(x_d+y_d)^{n_d} = \sum_{k_1=0}^{n_1}\dotsm\sum_{k_d=0}^{n_d} \binom{n_1}{k_1} x_1^{k_1}y_1^{n_1-k_1} \dotsc \binom{n_d}{k_d} x_d^{k_d}y_d^{n_d-k_d}.$$

This may be written more concisely, by multi-index notation, as
$$(x+y)^\alpha = \sum_{\nu \le \alpha} \binom{\alpha}{\nu} x^\nu y^{\alpha - \nu}.$$

=== General Leibniz rule ===
The general Leibniz rule gives the nth derivative of a product of two functions in a form similar to that of the binomial theorem:
$$(fg)^{(n)}(x) = \sum_{k=0}^n \binom{n}{k} f^{(n-k)}(x) g^{(k)}(x).$$

Here, the superscript (n) indicates the nth derivative of a function, $f^{(n)}(x) = \tfrac{d^n}{dx^n}f(x)$. If one sets f(x) = e^{ax} and g(x) = e^{bx}, cancelling the common factor of e^{(a + b)x} from each term gives the ordinary binomial theorem.

== History ==
Special cases of the binomial theorem were known since at least the 4th century BC when Greek mathematician Euclid mentioned the special case of the binomial theorem for exponent $n=2$. Greek mathematician Diophantus cubed various binomials, including $x-1$. Indian mathematician Aryabhata's method for finding cube roots, from around 510 AD, suggests that he knew the binomial formula for exponent $n=3$.

Binomial coefficients, as combinatorial quantities expressing the number of ways of selecting k objects out of n without replacement (combinations), were of interest to ancient Indian mathematicians. The Jain Bhagavati Sutra (c. 300 BC) describes the number of combinations of philosophical categories, senses, or other things, with correct results up through $n = 4$ (probably obtained by listing all possibilities and counting them) and a suggestion that higher combinations could likewise be found. The Chandaḥśāstra by the Indian lyricist Piṅgala (3rd or 2nd century BC) somewhat cryptically describes a method of arranging two types of syllables to form metres of various lengths and counting them; as interpreted and elaborated by Piṅgala's 10th-century commentator Halāyudha his "method of pyramidal expansion" (meru-prastāra) for counting metres is equivalent to Pascal's triangle. Varāhamihira (6th century AD) describes another method for computing combination counts by adding numbers in columns. By the 9th century at latest Indian mathematicians learned to express this as a product of fractions $\tfrac{n}1 \times \tfrac{n - 1}2 \times \cdots \times \tfrac{n - k + 1}{n-k}$, and clear statements of this rule can be found in Śrīdhara's Pāṭīgaṇita (8th–9th century), Mahāvīra's Gaṇita-sāra-saṅgraha (c. 850), and Bhāskara II's Līlāvatī (12th century).

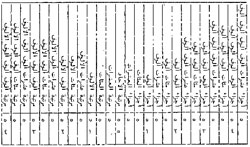
Al-Samaw-al Polynomial. Illustration of the al-Bahir fi'l-Jabr "The Brilliant in Algebra" from the 12th century.

The Persian mathematician al-Karajī (953–1029) wrote a now-lost book containing the binomial theorem and a table of binomial coefficients, often credited as their first appearance. An explicit statement of the binomial theorem appears in al-Samawʾal's al-Bāhir (12th century), there credited to al-Karajī. Al-Samawʾal algebraically expanded the square, cube, and fourth power of a binomial, each in terms of the previous power, and noted that similar proofs could be provided for higher powers, an early form of mathematical induction. He then provided al-Karajī's table of binomial coefficients (Pascal's triangle turned on its side) up to $n = 12$ and a rule for generating them equivalent to the recurrence relation $\textstyle \binom{n}{k} = \binom{n-1}{k-1} + \binom{n-1}{k}$. The Persian poet and mathematician Omar Khayyam was probably familiar with the formula to higher orders, although many of his mathematical works are lost. The binomial expansions of small degrees were known in the 13th century mathematical works of Yang Hui and also Chu Shih-Chieh. Yang Hui attributes the method to a much earlier 11th century text of Jia Xian, although those writings are now also lost.

In Europe, descriptions of the construction of Pascal's triangle can be found as early as Jordanus de Nemore's De arithmetica (13th century). In 1544, Michael Stifel introduced the term "binomial coefficient" and showed how to use them to express $(1+x)^n$ in terms of $(1+x)^{n-1}$, via "Pascal's triangle". Other 16th-century mathematicians, including Niccolò Fontana Tartaglia and Simon Stevin, also knew of it. 17th-century mathematician Blaise Pascal studied the eponymous triangle comprehensively in his Traité du triangle arithmétique.

Persian mathematician Jamshid al-Kashi's Key to Arithmetic (1427), building on the work of 13th century Persian mathematician Nasir al-Din al-Tusi, contains a table of binomial coefficients up to the 9th power, along with two rules used to construct them, $\textstyle \binom{n}{k} = \binom{n-1}{k-1} + \binom{n-1}{k}$ and $\textstyle \binom{n}{k} = \frac{n(n-1)\cdots(n-k+1)}{k(k-1)\cdots 1}$. In Europe, Henry Briggs (1561–1630) is recognized as the first to explicitly record both formulas, although evidence suggests Cardano may have independently known the results around 1570. The second formula was rigorously proven by Pascal in 1654 through the use of complete induction. By the early 17th century, some specific cases of the generalized binomial theorem, such as for $n=\tfrac{1}{2}$, can be found in the work of Henry Briggs' Arithmetica Logarithmica (1624). Isaac Newton discovered the generalized binomial theorem, valid for any real exponent, in 1664-5, inspired by the work of John Wallis's Arithmetic Infinitorum and his method of interpolation. A logarithmic version of the theorem for fractional exponents was discovered independently by James Gregory who wrote down his formula in 1670.

== Applications ==
=== Multiple-angle identities ===
For the complex numbers the binomial theorem can be combined with de Moivre's formula to yield multiple-angle formulas for the sine and cosine. According to De Moivre's formula,
$$\cos\left(nx\right)+i\sin\left(nx\right) = \left(\cos x+i\sin x\right)^n.$$

Using the binomial theorem, the expression on the right can be expanded, and then the real and imaginary parts can be taken to yield formulas for cos(nx) and sin(nx). For example, since
$$\left(\cos x + i\sin x\right)^2 = \cos^2 x + 2i \cos x \sin x - \sin^2 x
= (\cos^2 x-\sin^2 x) + i(2\cos x\sin x),$$
But De Moivre's formula identifies the left side with $(\cos x+i\sin x)^2 = \cos(2x)+i\sin(2x)$, so
$$\cos(2x) = \cos^2 x - \sin^2 x \quad\text{and}\quad\sin(2x) = 2 \cos x \sin x,$$
which are the usual double-angle identities. Similarly, since
$$\left(\cos x + i\sin x\right)^3 = \cos^3 x + 3i \cos^2 x \sin x - 3 \cos x \sin^2 x - i \sin^3 x,$$
De Moivre's formula yields
$$\cos(3x) = \cos^3 x - 3 \cos x \sin^2 x \quad\text{and}\quad \sin(3x) = 3\cos^2 x \sin x - \sin^3 x.$$
In general,
$$\cos(nx) = \sum_{k\text{ even}} (-1)^{k/2} {\binom{n}{k}}\cos^{n-k} x \sin^k x$$
and
$$\sin(nx) = \sum_{k\text{ odd}} (-1)^{(k-1)/2} {\binom{n}{k}}\cos^{n-k} x \sin^k x.$$
There are also similar formulas using Chebyshev polynomials.

=== Series for e ===
The number e is often defined by the formula
$$e = \lim_{n\to\infty} \left(1 + \frac{1}{n}\right)^n.$$

Applying the binomial theorem to this expression yields the usual infinite series for e. In particular:
$$\left(1 + \frac{1}{n}\right)^n = 1 + {\binom{n}{1}}\frac{1}{n} + {\binom{n}{2}}\frac{1}{n^2} + {\binom{n}{3}}\frac{1}{n^3} + \cdots + {\binom{n}{n}}\frac{1}{n^n}.$$

The kth term of this sum is
$${\binom{n}{k}}\frac{1}{n^k} = \frac{1}{k!}\cdot\frac{n(n-1)(n-2)\cdots (n-k+1)}{n^k}$$

As n → ∞, the rational expression on the right approaches 1, and therefore
$$\lim_{n\to\infty} {\binom{n}{k}}\frac{1}{n^k} = \frac{1}{k!}.$$

This indicates that e can be written as a series:
$$e=\sum_{k=0}^\infty\frac{1}{k!}=\frac{1}{0!} + \frac{1}{1!} + \frac{1}{2!} + \frac{1}{3!} + \cdots.$$

Indeed, since each term of the binomial expansion is an increasing function of n, it follows from the monotone convergence theorem for series that the sum of this infinite series is equal to e.

=== Probability ===
The binomial theorem is closely related to the probability mass function of the negative binomial distribution. The probability of a (countable) collection of independent Bernoulli trials $\{X_t\}_{t\in S}$ with probability of success $p\in [0,1]$ all not happening is
$$P\biggl(\bigcap_{t\in S} X_t^C\biggr) = (1-p)^{|S|} = \sum_{n=0}^{|S|} {\binom{|S|}{n}} (-p)^n.$$
An upper bound for this quantity is $e^{-p|S|}.$

== In abstract algebra ==
The binomial theorem is valid more generally for two elements x and y in a ring, or even a semiring, provided that xy = yx. For example, it holds for two n × n matrices, provided that those matrices commute; this is useful in computing powers of a matrix.

The binomial theorem can be stated by saying that the polynomial sequence {1, x, x^{2}, x^{3}, ...} is of binomial type.

== See also ==
- Binomial approximation
- Binomial distribution
- Binomial inverse theorem
- Binomial coefficient
- Stirling's approximation
- Tannery's theorem
- Polynomials calculating sums of powers of arithmetic progressions
- q-binomial theorem
