= Heinrich August Rothe =

German mathematician

Heinrich August Rothe (1773–1842) was a German mathematician, a professor of mathematics at Erlangen. He was a student of Carl Hindenburg and a member of Hindenburg's school of combinatorics.

== Biography ==
Rothe was born in 1773 in Dresden, and in 1793 became a docent at the University of Leipzig. He became an extraordinary professor at Leipzig in 1796, and in 1804 he moved to Erlangen as a full professor, taking over the chair formerly held by Karl Christian von Langsdorf. He died in 1842, and his position at Erlangen was in turn taken by Johann Wilhelm Pfaff, the brother of the more famous mathematician Johann Friedrich Pfaff.

== Research ==
The Rothe–Hagen identity, a summation formula for binomial coefficients, appeared in Rothe's 1793 thesis. It is named for him and for the later work of Johann Georg Hagen. The same thesis also included a formula for computing the Taylor series of an inverse function from the Taylor series for the function itself, related to the Lagrange inversion theorem.

In the study of permutations, Rothe was the first to define the inverse of a permutation, in 1800. He developed a technique for visualizing permutations now known as a Rothe diagram, a square table that has a dot in each cell (i,j) for which the permutation maps position i to position j and a cross in each cell (i,j) for which there is a dot later in row i and another dot later in column j. Using Rothe diagrams, he showed that the number of inversions in a permutation is the same as in its inverse, for the inverse permutation has as its diagram the transpose of the original diagram, and the inversions of both permutations are marked by the crosses. Rothe used this fact to show that the determinant of a matrix is the same as the determinant of the transpose: if one expands a determinant as a polynomial, each term corresponds to a permutation, and the sign of the term is determined by the parity of its number of inversions. Since each term of the determinant of the transpose corresponds to a term of the original matrix with the inverse permutation and the same number of inversions, it has the same sign, and so the two determinants are also the same.

In his 1800 work on permutations, Rothe also was the first to consider permutations that are involutions; that is, they are their own inverse, or equivalently they have symmetric Rothe diagrams. He found the recurrence relation

$$T(n) = T(n-1) + (n-1)T(n-2)$$

for counting these permutations, which also counts the number of Young tableaux, and which has as its solution the telephone numbers

1, 2, 4, 10, 26, 76, 232, 764, 2620, 9496, ... (sequence A000085 in the OEIS).

Rothe was also the first to formulate the q-binomial theorem, a q-analog of the binomial theorem, in an 1811 publication.

== Selected publications ==
- Formulae De Serierum Reversione Demonstratio Universalis Signis Localibus Combinatorio-Analyticorum Vicariis Exhibita: Dissertatio Academica, Leipzig, 1793.
- "Ueber Permutationen, in Beziehung auf die Stellen ihrer Elemente. Anwendung der daraus abgeleiteten Satze auf das Eliminationsproblem". In Hindenburg, Carl, ed., Sammlung Combinatorisch-Analytischer Abhandlungen, pp. 263–305, Bey G. Fleischer dem jüngern, 1800.
- Systematisches Lehrbuch der Arithmetik, Leipzig, 1811
