= Leibniz harmonic triangle =

Triangular arrangement of unit fractions

The Leibniz harmonic triangle is a triangular arrangement of unit fractions in which the outermost diagonals consist of the reciprocals of the row numbers and each inner cell is the cell diagonally above and to the left minus the cell to the left. To put it algebraically, L(r, 1) = 1/r (where r is the number of the row, starting from 1, and c is the column number, never more than r) and L(r, c) = L(r − 1, c − 1) − L(r, c − 1).

== Values ==
The first eight rows are:

$\begin{array}{cccccccccccccccccc} & & & & & & & & & 1 & & & & & & & &\\ & & & & & & & & \frac{1}{2} & & \frac{1}{2} & & & & & & &\\ & & & & & & & \frac{1}{3} & & \frac{1}{6} & & \frac{1}{3} & & & & & &\\ & & & & & & \frac{1}{4} & & \frac{1}{12} & & \frac{1}{12} & & \frac{1}{4} & & & & &\\ & & & & & \frac{1}{5} & & \frac{1}{20} & & \frac{1}{30} & & \frac{1}{20} & & \frac{1}{5} & & & &\\ & & & & \frac{1}{6} & & \frac{1}{30} & & \frac{1}{60} & & \frac{1}{60} & & \frac{1}{30} & & \frac{1}{6} & & &\\ & & & \frac{1}{7} & & \frac{1}{42} & & \frac{1}{105} & & \frac{1}{140} & & \frac{1}{105} & & \frac{1}{42} & & \frac{1}{7} & &\\ & & \frac{1}{8} & & \frac{1}{56} & & \frac{1}{168} & & \frac{1}{280} & & \frac{1}{280} & & \frac{1}{168} & & \frac{1}{56} & & \frac{1}{8} &\\ & & & & &\vdots & & & & \vdots & & & & \vdots& & & & \\ \end{array}$

The denominators are listed in (sequence A003506 in the OEIS), while the numerators are all 1s.

== Terms ==
The terms are given by the recurrence

$$L(r,1) = \frac{1}{r},$$
$$L(r,c) = L(r-1,c-1) - L(r,c-1),$$

and explicitly by

$$L(r,c) = \frac{1}{c\binom{r}{c}} = \frac{1}{r\binom{r-1}{c-1}},$$

where $\binom{n}{k}$ denotes binomial coefficients.

== Relation to Pascal's triangle ==
Whereas each entry in Pascal's triangle is the sum of the two entries in the above row, each entry in the Leibniz triangle is the sum of the two entries in the row below it. For example, in the 5th row, the entry (1/30) is the sum of the two (1/60)s in the 6th row.

Just as Pascal's triangle can be computed by using binomial coefficients, so can Leibniz's: $L(r, c) = \frac{1}{r {r-1 \choose c-1}}$. Furthermore, the entries of this triangle can be computed from Pascal's: "The terms in each row are the initial term divided by the corresponding Pascal triangle entries." In fact, each diagonal relates to corresponding Pascal Triangle diagonals: The first Leibniz diagonal consists of 1/(1x natural numbers), the second of 1/(2x triangular numbers), the third of 1/(3x tetrahedral numbers) and so on.

Moreover, each entry in the Harmonic triangle is equal to the reciprocal of the respective entry in Pascal's triangle multiplied by the reciprocal of the respective row, $r$ $h_{(r,c)} = \frac{1}{p_{(r,c)}}\times \frac{1}{r}$, where $h_{(r,c)}$ is the entry in the Harmonic triangle and $p_{(r,c)}$ is the respective entry in Pascal's triangle

== Infinite series ==
The infinite sum of all the terms in any diagonal equals the first term in the previous diagonal, that is $\sum_{r=c}^{\infty} L(r,c)=L(c-1,c-1)$ because the recurrence can be used to telescope the series as $\sum_{r=c}^{\infty} L(r,c)=\sum_{r=c}^{\infty} L(r-1,c-1)-L(r,c-1)=L(c-1,c-1)-\cancelto{0}{L(\infty,c-1)} :$ where $L(\infty,c-1)=\lim_{r\to\infty}L(r,c-1)=\lim_{r\to\infty}\frac{1}{r{r-1 \choose c-2}}=0$.

$$\begin{array}{cccccccccccccccccc}
& & & & & & {\color{red}1} & & & & & &\\
& & & & & \frac{1}{2} & &  {\color{blue}\frac{1}{2}} & & & &\\
& & & & \frac{1}{3} & &  {\color{blue}\frac{1}{6}} & & \frac{1}{3} & & &\\
& & & \frac{1}{4} & &  {\color{blue}\frac{1}{12}} & & \frac{1}{12} & & {\color{red}\frac{1}{4}} & &\\
& & \frac{1}{5} & &  {\color{blue}\frac{1}{20}} & & \frac{1}{30} & & \frac{1}{20} & & {\color{blue}\frac{1}{5}} &\\
& \frac{1}{6} & &  {\color{blue}\frac{1}{30}} & & \frac{1}{60} & & \frac{1}{60} & & {\color{blue}\frac{1}{30}} & & \frac{1}{6}\\
& & & &\vdots & & & &\vdots & & &\\
\end{array}$$

For example,

$${\color{blue}\frac{1}{2}+\frac{1}{6}+\frac{1}{12}+...}=\frac{1}{1}-\frac{1}{2}+\frac{1}{2}-\frac{1}{3}+\frac{1}{3}-\frac{1}{4}+...={\color{red}1}$$

$${\color{blue}\frac{1}{5}+\frac{1}{30}+\frac{1}{105}+...}=\frac{1}{4}-\frac{1}{20}+\frac{1}{20}-\frac{1}{60}+\frac{1}{60}-\frac{1}{140}+...={\color{red}\frac{1}{4}}$$

Replacing the formula for the coefficients we get the infinite series $\sum_{r=c}^{\infty} \frac{1}{r{r-1 \choose c-1}}=\frac{1}{c-1}$, the first example given here appeared originally on work of Leibniz around 1694

== Properties ==
If one takes the denominators of the nth row and adds them, then the result will equal $n 2^{n - 1}$. For example, for the 3rd row, we have 3 + 6 + 3 = 12 = 3 × 2^{2}.

We have $L(r, c) = \int_0^1 \! x ^ {c-1} (1-x)^{r-c} \,dx.$

== See also ==
- Pascal's rule
- Hockey-stick identity
