= Vandermonde's identity =

Mathematical theorem on convolved binomial coefficients

In combinatorics, Vandermonde's identity (or Vandermonde's convolution) is the following identity for binomial coefficients:

$${m+n \choose r}=\sum_{k=0}^r{m \choose k}{n \choose r-k}$$

for any nonnegative integers r, m, n. The identity is named after Alexandre-Théophile Vandermonde (1772), although it was already known in 1303 by the Chinese mathematician Zhu Shijie.

There is a q-analog to this theorem called the q-Vandermonde identity.

Vandermonde's identity can be generalized in numerous ways, including to the identity

$${ n_1+\dots +n_p \choose m }= \sum_{k_1+\cdots +k_p = m} {n_1\choose k_1} {n_2\choose k_2} \cdots {n_p\choose k_p}.$$

== Proofs ==
=== Algebraic proof ===
In general, the product of two polynomials with degrees m and n, respectively, is given by

$$\biggl(\sum_{i=0}^m a_ix^i\biggr) \biggl(\sum_{j=0}^n b_jx^j\biggr)
= \sum_{r=0}^{m+n}\biggl(\sum_{k=0}^r a_k b_{r-k}\biggr) x^r,$$

where we use the convention that a_{i} = 0 for all integers i > m and b_{j} = 0 for all integers j > n. By the binomial theorem,

$$(1+x)^{m+n} = \sum_{r=0}^{m+n} {m+n \choose r}x^r.$$

Using the binomial theorem also for the exponents m and n, and then the above formula for the product of polynomials, we obtain

$$\begin{align}
\sum_{r=0}^{m+n} {m+n \choose r}x^r
&= (1+x)^{m+n}\\
&= (1+x)^m (1+x)^n \\
&= \biggl(\sum_{i=0}^m {m\choose i}x^i\biggr)
\biggl(\sum_{j=0}^n {n\choose j}x^j\biggr)\\
&=\sum_{r=0}^{m+n}\biggl(\sum_{k=0}^r {m\choose k} {n\choose r-k}\biggr) x^r,
\end{align}$$

where the above convention for the coefficients of the polynomials agrees with the definition of the binomial coefficients, because both give zero for all i > m and j > n, respectively.

By comparing coefficients of x^{r}, Vandermonde's identity follows for all integers r with 0 ≤ r ≤ m + n. For larger integers r, both sides of Vandermonde's identity are zero due to the definition of binomial coefficients.

=== Combinatorial proof ===
Vandermonde's identity also admits a combinatorial double counting proof, as follows. Suppose a committee consists of m men and n women. In how many ways can a subcommittee of r members be formed? The answer is

$${m+n \choose r}.$$

The answer is also the sum over all possible values of k, of the number of subcommittees consisting of k men and r − k women:

$$\sum_{k=0}^r{m \choose k}{n \choose r-k}.$$

=== Geometrical proof ===
Take a rectangular grid of r x (m+n−r) squares. There are

$$\binom{r+(m+n-r)}{r}=\binom{m+n}{r}$$

paths that start on the bottom left vertex and, moving only upwards or rightwards, end at the top right vertex (this is because r right moves and m+n-r up moves must be made (or vice versa) in any order, and the total path length is m + n). Call the bottom left vertex (0, 0).

There are $\binom{m}{k}$ paths starting at (0, 0) that end at (k, m−k), as k right moves and m−k upward moves must be made (and the path length is m). Similarly, there are $\binom{n}{r-k}$ paths starting at (k, m−k) that end at (r, m+n−r), as a total of r−k right moves and (m+n−r) − (m−k) upward moves must be made and the path length must be r−k + (m+n−r) − (m−k) = n. Thus there are

$$\binom{m}{k}\binom{n}{r-k}$$

paths that start at (0, 0), end at (r, m+n−r), and go through (k, m−k). This is a subset of all paths that start at (0, 0) and end at (r, m+n−r), so sum from k = 0 to k = r (as the point (k, m−k) is confined to be within the square) to obtain the total number of paths that start at (0, 0) and end at (r, m+n−r).

== Generalizations ==
=== Generalized Vandermonde's identity ===
One can generalize Vandermonde's identity as follows:

$$\sum_{k_1+\cdots +k_p = m} {n_1\choose k_1} {n_2\choose k_2} \cdots {n_p\choose k_p} = { n_1+\dots +n_p \choose m }.$$

This identity can be obtained through the algebraic derivation above when more than two polynomials are used, or through a simple double counting argument.

On the one hand, one chooses $\textstyle k_1$ elements out of a first set of $\textstyle n_1$ elements; then $\textstyle k_2$ out of another set, and so on, through $\textstyle p$ such sets, until a total of $\textstyle m$ elements have been chosen from the $\textstyle p$ sets. One therefore chooses $\textstyle m$ elements out of $\textstyle n_1+\dots +n_p$ in the left-hand side, which is also exactly what is done in the right-hand side.

=== Chu–Vandermonde identity ===
The identity generalizes to non-integer arguments. In this case, it is known as the Chu–Vandermonde identity (see Askey 1975, pp. 59–60) and takes the form

$${s+t \choose n}=\sum_{k=0}^n {s \choose k}{t \choose n-k}$$

for general complex-valued s and t and any non-negative integer n. It can be proved along the lines of the algebraic proof above by multiplying the binomial series for $(1+x)^s$ and $(1+x)^t$ and comparing terms with the binomial series for $(1+x)^{s+t}$.

This identity may be rewritten in terms of the falling Pochhammer symbols as

$$(s+t)_n = \sum_{k=0}^n {n \choose k} (s)_k (t)_{n-k}$$

in which form it is clearly recognizable as an umbral variant of the binomial theorem (for more on umbral variants of the binomial theorem, see binomial type). The Chu–Vandermonde identity can also be seen to be a special case of Gauss's hypergeometric theorem, which states that

$$\;_2F_1(a,b;c;1) = \frac{\Gamma(c)\Gamma(c-a-b)}{\Gamma(c-a)\Gamma(c-b)}$$

where $\;_2F_1$ is the hypergeometric function and $\Gamma(n+1)=n!$ is the gamma function. One regains the Chu–Vandermonde identity by taking a = −n and applying the identity

$${n\choose k} = (-1)^k {k-n-1 \choose k}$$

liberally.

The Rothe–Hagen identity is a further generalization of this identity.

== The hypergeometric probability distribution ==
When both sides have been divided by the expression on the left, so that the sum is 1, then the terms of the sum may be interpreted as probabilities. The resulting probability distribution is the hypergeometric distribution. That is the probability distribution of the number of red marbles in r draws without replacement from an urn containing n red and m blue marbles.

== See also ==
- Pascal's identity
- Hockey-stick identity
- Rothe–Hagen identity
