= Carl Hindenburg =

German mathematician

Carl Friedrich Hindenburg (13 July 1741 – 17 March 1808) was a German mathematician born in Dresden. His work centered mostly on combinatorics and probability.

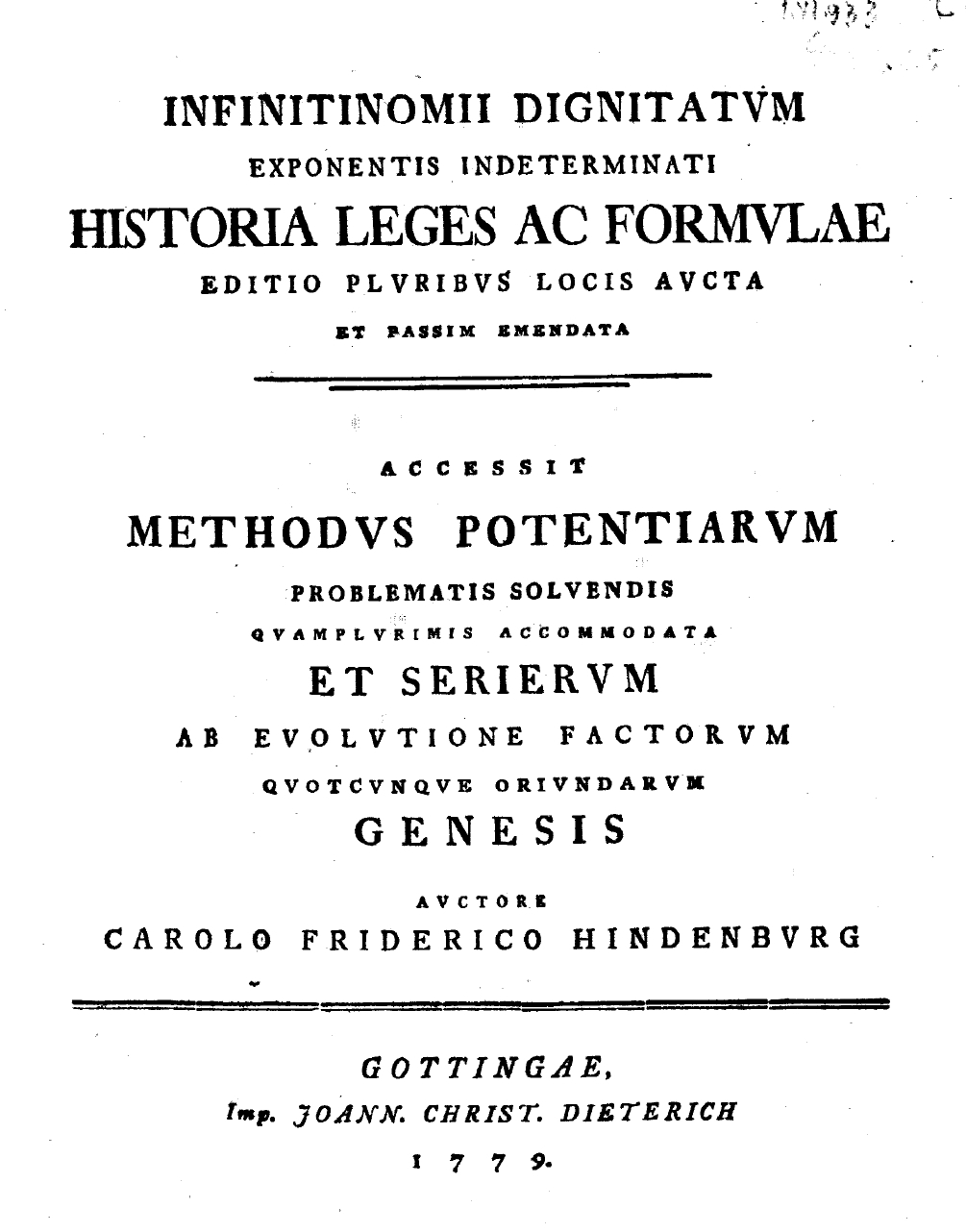
Infinitinomii dignitatum exponentis indeterminati historia leges ac formulae editio pluribus locis aucta et passim emendata, 1779

== Education ==
Hindenburg did not attend school but was educated at home by a private tutor as arranged by his merchant father. He went to the University of Leipzig in 1757 and took courses in medicine, philosophy, Latin, Greek, physics, mathematics, and aesthetics. Hindenburg later published on philology in 1763 and 1769.

Hindenburg was mentored by Christian Fürchtegott Gellert, a popular lecturer in Leipzig who introduced Hindenburg to a student named Schönborn. Schönborn's interest in mathematics influenced Hindenburg to go into the field as well. He obtained a master's degree from the University of Leipzig in 1771.

== Career ==
On obtaining his master's degree at Leipzig in 1771, Hindenburg was made Privatdozent there.

In 1781, Hindenburg was appointed as professor of philosophy in the University of Leipzig. He would be appointed professor of physics in 1786 after presenting a dissertation on water pumps. Hindenburg served as academic dean at the University of Leipzig, where he was also Rector in 1792. He became a member of the Berlin Academy of Sciences on 5 August 1806.

== Research contributions ==
Hindenburg's first published mathematical publication, Beschreibung einer ganz neuen Art, nach einem bekannten Gesetze fortgehende Zahlen, durch Abzahlen oder Abmessen bequem und sicher zu finden, originated as a project to extend then-existing prime tables up to 5 million. In the book, he mechanically realizes, independent of the work done by Felkel, the sieve of Eratosthenes, which he then proceeds with rules to both optimize and organize. The book also contained results in linear diophantine analysis, decimal periods, combinations, and gave combinatorial significance to the digits of numbers written in decimal notation.

In 1778, he started publishing a series of works on combinatorics, particularly on probability, series and formulae for higher differentials. He worked on a generalization of the binomial theorem and was a major influence in Gudermann's work on the expansion of functions into power series.

== Editorial work ==
Hindenburg co-founded the first German mathematical journals. Between 1780 and 1800, he was involved at different times with the publishing of four different journals all relating to mathematics and its applications. Two of the journals, the Leipziger Magazin für reine und angewandte Mathematik (1786–1789) and the Archiv für reine und angewandte Mathematik (1795–1799), published Johann Heinrich Lambert's Nachlass as edited by Johann Bernoulli. In 1796, he edited the Sammlung combinatorisch-analytischer Abhandlungen, which contained a claim that de Moivre's multinomial theorem was “the most important proposition in all of mathematical analysis”.

== Students ==
One of Hindenburg's best students, according to Donald Knuth, is Heinrich August Rothe. Another student, Johann Karl Burckhardt published the book Theorie der Kettenbrüche after being encouraged by Hindenburg to work on continued fractions. He also influenced Christian Kramp's work in combinatorics.
