= Rothe–Hagen identity =

Generalization of Vandermonde's identity

In mathematics, the Rothe–Hagen identity is a mathematical identity valid for all complex numbers ($x, y, z$) except where its denominators vanish:

$$\sum_{k=0}^n\frac{x}{x+kz}{x+kz \choose k}\frac{y}{y+(n-k)z}{y+(n-k)z \choose n-k}=\frac{x+y}{x+y+nz}{x+y+nz \choose n}.$$

It is a generalization of Vandermonde's identity, and is named after the independent work of Heinrich August Rothe in 1793 and of Johann Georg Hagen in 1891.
