= Sacred Heart College (Wisconsin) =

- Other name: Campion College
- Active: 1880–1925
- Affiliations: Jesuit
- Location: Prairie du Chien, Wisconsin, United States

Sacred Heart College, later renamed Campion College, was a Jesuit-operated college in Prairie du Chien, Wisconsin founded in 1880. It was established by German Jesuits and trained people to serve in various capacities within the Roman Catholic Church. In 1888, the college closed to lay students. In 1898, it reopened to the laity as both a high school and college. The college was renamed Campion College in 1913. Though the college was shuttered in 1925, the associated high school, Campion High School, remained in operation until 1975. The astronomer priest, Johann Georg Hagen taught in the college before moving to Georgetown University.
