= Hagen (crater) =

Crater on the Moon

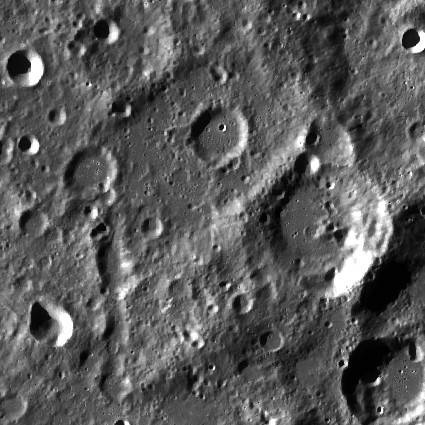
- Coordinates: 48.3°S 135.1°E
- Diameter: 55 km
- Depth: Unknown
- Colongitude: 226° at sunrise
- Eponym: Johann G. Hagen

Hagen is a lunar impact crater on the far side of the Moon. It lies to the north of the huge walled plain called Planck, and south-southwest of the crater Pauli.

This is a very eroded crater with an outer rim that has been worn and broken in several places by overlapping craters. Hagen J is attached to what remains of the southeastern rim, and Hagen S crosses the rim to the west. On the interior floor, Hagen C lies just to the southeast of the midpoint. There are small craterlets along the inner edge to the south and west. The floor is pock-marked by tiny craterlets, but is otherwise relatively featureless.

== Satellite craters ==
By convention these features are identified on lunar maps by placing the letter on the side of the crater midpoint that is closest to Hagen.

Hagen	Latitude	Longitude	Diameter
C	48.0° S	135.5° E	22 km
J	49.0° S	137.2° E	47 km
P	52.1° S	133.7° E	26 km
Q	50.0° S	132.7° E	20 km
S	48.3° S	133.2° E	23 km
V	47.1° S	132.2° E	12 km

Hagen V dates to the Eratosthenian period and has a meteoritic iron-rich impact melt.
