= Anton Felkel =

Austrian mathematician

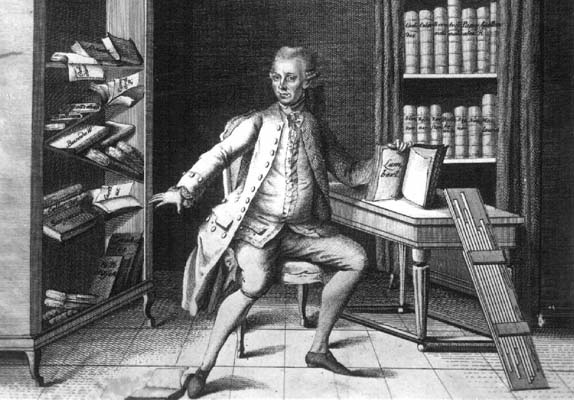
Engraving showing Anton Felkel

Anton Felkel (26 April 1740, Kamenz, Silesia – c. 1800, possibly in Lisbon, Portugal) was an Austrian mathematician who worked on the determination of prime numbers.

== Work ==
In 1776 and 1777, Felkel published a table giving complete prime factorizations of all integers not divisible by 2, 3, and 5, from 1 to 408,000. Felkel had planned to extend his table to 10 million.

== Publications ==
- Tafel aller einfachen Factoren der durch 2, 3, 5 nicht theilbaren Zahlen von 1 bis 10 000 000. Vienna: 1776;
  - I. Theil enthaltend die Factoren von 1 bis 144000 (also published in Latin)
  - Pars II. exhibens factores numerorum ab 144001 usque 336000
  - Pars III. exhibens factores numerorum ab 336001 usque 408000
- Wahre Beschaffenheit des Donners: Eine ganz neue Entdeckung durch einen Liebhaber der Naturkunde. Wien: v. Ghelen, 1780;
- Neueröffnetes Geheimniss der Parallellinien enthaltend verschiedene wichtige Zusätze zur Proportion und Körperlehre von Anton Felkel; nebst einer dreyfachen vorläufigen Nachricht von den dazu dienenden neuerfundenen mechanischen Kunstgriffen etc. Wien; von Ghelenschen Buchhandlung, 1781;
