= Johann Georg Hagen =

Austrian Jesuit priest and astronomer (1847–1930)

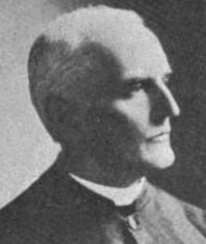
- Hagen in a 1917 publication
- Born: March 6, 1847; Bregenz, Austria
- Died: September 6, 1930 (aged 83); Rome, Italy
- Education: Stella Matutina; University of Bonn; University of Münster
- Occupation: Clergyman
- Known for: Rothe–Hagen identity Hagen cloud
- Scientific career
- Fields: Astronomy

Johann (John) Georg Hagen (March 6, 1847 – September 6, 1930) was an Austrian Jesuit priest and astronomer. After serving as Director of the Georgetown University Observatory he was called to Rome by Pope Pius X in 1906 to be the first Jesuit director of the new Vatican Observatory. Father Hagen was also the spiritual director of Maria Elizabeth Hesselblad (1870-1957), who was baptized by him on August 15, 1902 and eventually was canonized on June 5, 2016 by Pope Francis.

== Biography ==
=== Early life ===
Johann Georg Hagen was born in Bregenz, Austria on 6 March 1847, the son of a school teacher.

=== Entering the Jesuit Order ===
Johann entered the Society of Jesus, commonly known as the Jesuits, in Gorheim, Germany in 1863. He attended the Jesuit College Stella Matutina in Feldkirch, Austria and also studied mathematics and astronomy at the University of Bonn and the University of Münster. He volunteered for the ambulance service in the Franco-Prussian War, but was struck with typhoid fever.

=== Expulsion ===
On July 4, 1872, Otto von Bismarck, chancellor of Germany, expelled the Jesuits from the German Empire. Johann left for England where he was eventually ordained into the priesthood.

=== Emigration to US ===
In June 1880, he left England for the United States. There he began teaching at Sacred Heart College in Prairie du Chien, Wisconsin. There he cultivated his interest in astronomy and built a small observatory for making astronomical observations. In Wisconsin, he became a naturalized citizen.

He was called to serve as the Director of the Georgetown University Observatory in 1888. There he continued his research and published numerous articles and texts.

He contributed several articles on astronomical topics to the Catholic Encyclopedia.

=== Vatican Observatory ===
In 1906, John was called by Pope Pius X to take charge of the Vatican Observatory in Rome. He died in Rome on September 6, 1930.

== Research ==
Hagen is also noted for his study of variable stars. His survey was published in his Atlas Stellarum Variabilium (1890–1902).

In mathematics, the Rothe–Hagen identity is named after him; it appears in his three-volume 1891 publication, Synopsis of Higher Mathematics.

At the Vatican observatory, he reported a dark nebula that he could not photograph in 1931. This object is known as the Hagen cloud. Modern astronomy has discarded the existence of that nebula and has attributed it to inconsistencies in visual perception.

== Honors and awards ==
The crater Hagen, 55 km in diameter, on the far side of the Moon is named after him.

The asteroid 562971 Johannhagen is named after him.

== Publications ==
- Atlas Stellarum Variabilium [Atlas of Variable Stars] (in Latin). Berlin: Felix L. Dames. 1890–1908.
- with G. A. Fargis: The photochronograph, and its applications to star transits. Georgetown, D. C.: Georgetown College Observatory. 1891.
- Synopsis der höheren Mathematik. Vol. 4 vols. Berlin: F. L. Dames.Vol. 1: Arithmetische und algebraische Analyse. 1891.Vol. 2: Geometrie der algebraischen Gebilde. 1894.Vol. 3: Differential- und Integralrechnung. 1905.Vol. 4: Differentialgeometrie der Ebene und des Raumes. 1930.
- Index operum Leonardi Euleri. Berlin: F. L. Dames. 1896.
- Hagen, J. G. (1900). "On the history of the extensions of the calculus". Bull. Amer. Math. Soc. 6 (9): 381–390. doi:10.1090/s0002-9904-1900-00733-6. MR 1557730.
- La rotation de la terre, ses preuves mécaniques anciennes et nouvelles. Rome: Tipografia Vaticana. 1911.

== See also ==
- List of craters on the Moon, G-K
- List of Roman Catholic scientist-clerics
