= Monoidal t-norm logic =

In mathematical logic, monoidal t-norm based logic (or shortly MTL), the logic of left-continuous t-norms, is one of the t-norm fuzzy logics. It belongs to the broader class of substructural logics, or logics of residuated lattices; it extends the logic of commutative bounded integral residuated lattices (known as Höhle's monoidal logic, Ono's FL_{ew}, or intuitionistic logic without contraction) by the axiom of prelinearity.

== Motivation ==
In fuzzy logic, rather than regarding statements as being either true or false, we associate each statement with a numerical confidence in that statement. By convention the confidences range over the unit interval $[0,1]$, where the maximal confidence $1$ corresponds to the classical concept of true and the minimal confidence $0$ corresponds to the classical concept of false.

T-norms are binary functions on the real unit interval [0, 1] that in fuzzy logic are often used to represent a conjunction connective; if $a,b \in [0,1]$ are the confidences we ascribe to the statements $A$ and $B$ respectively, then one uses a t-norm $*$ to calculate the confidence $a*b$ ascribed to the compound statement ‘$A$ and $B$’. A t-norm $*$ has to satisfy the properties of

commutativity $a*b = b*a$,
associativity $(a*b)*c = a*(b*c)$,
monotonicity — if $a \leqslant b$ and $c \leqslant d$ then $a*c \leqslant b*d$,
and having 1 as identity element $1*a = a$.

Notably absent from this list is the property of idempotence $a*a = a$; the closest one gets is that $a*a \leqslant 1*a = a$. It may seem strange to be less confident in ‘$A$ and $A$’ than in just $A$, but we generally do want to allow for letting the confidence $a*b$ in a combined ‘$A$ and $B$’ be less than both the confidence $a$ in $A$ and the confidence $b$ in $B$, and then the ordering $a*b < a \leqslant b$ by monotonicity requires $a*a \leqslant a*b < a$. Another way of putting it is that the t-norm can only take into account the confidences as numbers, not the reasons that may be behind ascribing those confidences; thus it cannot treat ‘$A$ and $A$’ differently from ‘$A$ and $B$, where we are equally confident in both’.

Because the symbol $\wedge$ via its use in lattice theory is very closely associated with the idempotence property, it can be useful to switch to a different symbol for conjunction that is not necessarily idempotent. In the fuzzy logic tradition one sometimes uses $\&$ for this "strong" conjunction, but this article follows the substructural logic tradition of using $\otimes$ for the strong conjunction; thus $a*b$ is the confidence we ascribe to the statement $A \otimes B$ (still read ‘$A$ and $B$’, perhaps with ‘strong’ or ‘multiplicative’ as qualification of the ‘and’).

Having formalised conjunction $\otimes$, one wishes to continue with the other connectives. One approach to doing that is to introduce negation as an order-reversing map $[0,1] \longrightarrow [0,1]$, then defining remaining connectives using De Morgan's laws, material implication, and the like. A problem with doing so is that the resulting logics may have undesirable properties: they may be too close to classical logic, or if not conversely not support expected inference rules. An alternative that makes the consequences of different choices more predictable is to instead continue with implication $\to$ as the second connective: this is overall the most common connective in axiomatisations of logic, and it has closer ties to the deductive aspects of logic than most other connectives. A confidence counterpart $\Rightarrow$ of the traditional implication connective may in fact be defined directly as the residuum of the t-norm.

The logical link between conjunction and implication is provided by something as fundamental as the inference rule modus ponens $A, A \to B \vdash B$: from $A$ and $A \to B$ follows $B$. In the fuzzy logic case that is more rigorously written as $A \otimes (A \to B) \vdash B$, because this makes explicit that our confidence for the premise(s) here is that in $A \otimes (A \to B)$, not those in $A$ and $A \to B$ separately. So if $a$ and $b$ are our confidences in $A$ and $B$ respectively, then $a \Rightarrow b$ is the sought confidence in $A \to B$, and $a * (a \Rightarrow b)$ is the combined confidence in $A \otimes (A \to B)$. We require that

$$a * (a \mathbin{\Rightarrow} b) \leqslant b$$

since our confidence $b$ for $B$ should not be less than our confidence $a * (a \Rightarrow b)$ in the statement $A \otimes (A \to B)$ from which $B$ logically follows. This bounds the sought confidence $a \Rightarrow b$, and one approach for turning $\Rightarrow$ into a binary operation like $*$ would be to make it as large as possible while respecting this bound:

$$a \mathbin{\Rightarrow} b  \equiv  \sup \left\{ x \in [0,1] \;\big|\; a*x \leqslant b \right\}$$.

Taking $x=0$ gives $a*x = a*0 \leqslant 1*0 = 0 \leqslant b$, so the supremum is always of a nonempty bounded set and thus well-defined. For a general t-norm there remains the possibility that $f_a(x) = a*x$ has a jump discontinuity at $x = a \mathbin{\Rightarrow} b$, in which case $a * (a \mathbin{\Rightarrow} b)$ could come out strictly larger than $b$ even though $a \mathbin{\Rightarrow} b$ is defined as the least upper bound of $x$s satisfying $a*x \leqslant b$; to prevent that and have the construction work as expected, we require that the t-norm $*$ is left-continuous. The residuum of a left-continuous t-norm thus can be characterized as the weakest function that makes the fuzzy modus ponens valid, which makes it a suitable truth function for implication in fuzzy logic.

More algebraically, we say that an operation $\Rightarrow$ is a residuum of a t-norm $*$ if for all $a$, $b$, and $c$ it satisfies

$a*b\le c$ if and only if $a\le (b \mathbin{\Rightarrow} c)$.

This equivalence of numerical comparisons mirrors the equivalence of entailments

$A \otimes B \vdash C$ if and only if $A \vdash B \to C$

that exists because any proof of $C$ from the premise $A \otimes B$ can be converted into a proof of $B \to C$ from the premise $A$ by doing an extra implication introduction step, and conversely any proof of $B \to C$ from the premise $A$ can be converted into a proof of $C$ from the premise $A \otimes B$ by doing an extra implication elimination step. Left-continuity of the t-norm is the necessary and sufficient condition for this relationship between a t-norm conjunction and its residual implication to hold.

Truth functions of further propositional connectives can be defined by means of the t-norm and its residuum, for instance the residual negation $\neg x=(x\mathbin{\Rightarrow} 0).$ In this way, the left-continuous t-norm, its residuum, and the truth functions of additional propositional connectives (see the section Standard semantics below) determine the truth values of complex propositional formulae in [0, 1]. Formulae that always evaluate to 1 are then called tautologies with respect to the given left-continuous t-norm $*,$ or $*\mbox{-}$tautologies. The set of all $*\mbox{-}$tautologies is called the logic of the t-norm $*,$ since these formulae represent the laws of fuzzy logic (determined by the t-norm) that hold (to degree 1) regardless of the truth degrees of atomic formulae. Some formulae are tautologies with respect to all left-continuous t-norms: they represent general laws of propositional fuzzy logic that are independent of the choice of a particular left-continuous t-norm. These formulae form the logic MTL, which can thus be characterized as the logic of left-continuous t-norms.

== Syntax ==
=== Language ===
The language of the propositional logic MTL consists of countably many propositional variables and the following primitive logical connectives:

- Implication $\rightarrow$ (binary)
- Strong conjunction $\otimes$ (binary). The sign & is a more traditional notation for strong conjunction in the literature on fuzzy logic, while the notation $\otimes$ follows the tradition of substructural logics.
- Weak conjunction $\wedge$ (binary), also called lattice conjunction (as it is always realized by the lattice operation of meet in algebraic semantics). Unlike in BL and stronger fuzzy logics, weak conjunction is not definable in MTL and has to be included among the primitive connectives.
- Bottom $\bot$ (nullary — a propositional constant; $0$ or $\overline{0}$ are common alternative tokens and zero a common alternative name for the propositional constant (as the constants bottom and zero of substructural logics coincide in MTL).

The following are the most common defined logical connectives:

- Negation $\neg$ (unary), defined as

$$\neg A \equiv A \rightarrow \bot$$

- Equivalence $\leftrightarrow$ (binary), defined as

$$A \leftrightarrow B \equiv (A \rightarrow B) \wedge (B \rightarrow A)$$

In MTL, the definition is equivalent to $(A \rightarrow B) \otimes (B \rightarrow A).$

- (Weak) disjunction $\vee$ (binary), also called lattice disjunction (as it is always realized by the lattice operation of join in algebraic semantics), defined as

$$A \vee B \equiv ((A \rightarrow B) \rightarrow B) \wedge ((B \rightarrow A) \rightarrow A)$$

- Top $\top$ (nullary), also called one and denoted by $1$ or $\overline{1}$ (as the constants top and zero of substructural logics coincide in MTL), defined as

$$\top \equiv \bot \rightarrow \bot$$

Well-formed formulae of MTL are defined as usual in propositional logics. In order to save parentheses, it is common to use the following order of precedence:

- Unary connectives (bind most closely)
- Binary connectives other than implication and equivalence
- Implication and equivalence (bind most loosely)

=== Axioms ===
A Hilbert-style deduction system for MTL has been introduced by Esteva and Godo (2001). Its single derivation rule is modus ponens:

from $A$ and $A \rightarrow B$ derive $B.$

The following are its axiom schemata:

$$\begin{array}{ll}
{\rm (MTL1)}\colon & (A \rightarrow B) \rightarrow ((B \rightarrow C) \rightarrow (A \rightarrow C)) \\
{\rm (MTL2)}\colon & A \otimes B \rightarrow A\\
{\rm (MTL3)}\colon & A \otimes B \rightarrow B \otimes A\\
{\rm (MTL4a)}\colon &  A \wedge B \rightarrow A\\
{\rm (MTL4b)}\colon &  A \wedge B \rightarrow B \wedge A\\
{\rm (MTL4c)}\colon &  A \otimes (A \rightarrow B) \rightarrow A \wedge B\\
{\rm (MTL5a)}\colon &  (A \rightarrow (B \rightarrow C)) \rightarrow (A \otimes B \rightarrow C)\\
{\rm (MTL5b)}\colon &  (A \otimes B \rightarrow C) \rightarrow (A \rightarrow (B \rightarrow C))\\
{\rm (MTL6)}\colon &  ((A \rightarrow B) \rightarrow C) \rightarrow (((B \rightarrow A) \rightarrow C) \rightarrow C)\\
{\rm (MTL7)}\colon &  \bot \rightarrow A
\end{array}$$

The traditional numbering of axioms, given in the left column, is derived from the numbering of axioms of Hájek's basic fuzzy logic BL. The axioms (MTL4a)–(MTL4c) replace the axiom of divisibility (BL4) of BL. The axioms (MTL5a) and (MTL5b) express the law of residuation and the axiom (MTL6) corresponds to the condition of prelinearity. The axioms (MTL2) and (MTL3) of the original axiomatic system were shown to be redundant (Chvalovský, 2012) and (Cintula, 2005). All the other axioms were shown to be independent (Chvalovský, 2012).

== Semantics ==
Like in other propositional t-norm fuzzy logics, algebraic semantics is predominantly used for MTL, with three main classes of algebras with respect to which the logic is complete:

- General semantics, formed of all MTL-algebras — that is, all algebras for which the logic is sound
- Linear semantics, formed of all linear MTL-algebras — that is, all MTL-algebras whose lattice order is linear
- Standard semantics, formed of all standard MTL-algebras — that is, all MTL-algebras whose lattice reduct is the real unit interval [0, 1] with the usual order; they are uniquely determined by the function that interprets strong conjunction, which can be any left-continuous t-norm

=== General semantics ===
==== MTL-algebras ====
Algebras for which the logic MTL is sound are called MTL-algebras. They can be characterized as prelinear commutative bounded integral residuated lattices. In more detail, an algebraic structure $(L,\wedge,\vee,\ast,\Rightarrow,0,1)$ is an MTL-algebra if

- $(L,\wedge,\vee,0,1)$ is a bounded lattice with the top element 0 and bottom element 1
- $(L,\ast,1)$ is a commutative monoid
- $\ast$ and $\Rightarrow$ form an adjoint pair, that is, $z*x\le y$ if and only if $z\le x\Rightarrow y,$ where $\le$ is the lattice order of $(L,\wedge,\vee),$ for all x, y, and z in $L$, (the residuation condition)
- $(x\Rightarrow y)\vee(y\Rightarrow x)=1$ holds for all x and y in L (the prelinearity condition)

Important examples of MTL algebras are standard MTL-algebras on the real unit interval [0, 1]. Further examples include all Boolean algebras, all linear Heyting algebras (both with $\ast=\wedge$), all MV-algebras, all BL-algebras, etc. Since the residuation condition can equivalently be expressed by identities, MTL-algebras form a variety.

==== Interpretation of the logic MTL in MTL-algebras ====
The connectives of MTL are interpreted in MTL-algebras as follows:

- Strong conjunction by the monoidal operation $\ast$
- Implication by the operation $\Rightarrow$ (which is called the residuum of $\ast$)
- Weak conjunction and weak disjunction by the lattice operations $\wedge$ and $\vee,$ respectively (usually denoted by the same symbols as the connectives, if no confusion can arise)
- The truth constants zero (top) and one (bottom) by the constants 0 and 1
- The equivalence connective is interpreted by the operation $\Leftrightarrow$ defined as

$$x\Leftrightarrow y \equiv (x\Rightarrow y)\wedge(y\Rightarrow x)$$

Due to the prelinearity condition, this definition is equivalent to one that uses $\ast$ instead of $\wedge,$ thus

$$x\Leftrightarrow y \equiv (x\Rightarrow y)\ast(y\Rightarrow x)$$

- Negation is interpreted by the definable operation $-x \equiv x\Rightarrow 0$

With this interpretation of connectives, any evaluation e_{v} of propositional variables in L uniquely extends to an evaluation e of all well-formed formulae of MTL, by the following inductive definition (which generalizes Tarski's truth conditions), for any formulae A, B, and any propositional variable p:

$$\begin{array}{rcl}
e(p)                  &=& e_{\mathrm v}(p)
\\ e(\bot)               &=& 0
\\ e(\top)               &=& 1
\\ e(A\otimes B)         &=& e(A) \ast e(B)
\\ e(A\rightarrow B)     &=& e(A) \Rightarrow e(B)
\\ e(A\wedge B)          &=& e(A) \wedge e(B)
\\ e(A\vee B)            &=& e(A) \vee e(B)
\\ e(A\leftrightarrow B) &=& e(A) \Leftrightarrow e(B)
\\ e(\neg A)             &=& e(A) \Rightarrow 0
\end{array}$$

Informally, the truth value 1 represents full truth and the truth value 0 represents full falsity; intermediate truth values represent intermediate degrees of truth. Thus a formula is considered fully true under an evaluation e if e(A) = 1. A formula A is said to be valid in an MTL-algebra L if it is fully true under all evaluations in L, that is, if e(A) = 1 for all evaluations e in L. Some formulae (for instance, p → p) are valid in any MTL-algebra; these are called tautologies of MTL.

The notion of global entailment (or: global consequence) is defined for MTL as follows: a set of formulae Γ entails a formula A (or: A is a global consequence of Γ), in symbols $\Gamma\models A,$ if for any evaluation e in any MTL-algebra, whenever e(B) = 1 for all formulae B in Γ, then also e(A) = 1. Informally, the global consequence relation represents the transmission of full truth in any MTL-algebra of truth values.

==== General soundness and completeness theorems ====
The logic MTL is sound and complete with respect to the class of all MTL-algebras (Esteva & Godo, 2001):

A formula is provable in MTL if and only if it is valid in all MTL-algebras.

The notion of MTL-algebra is in fact so defined that MTL-algebras form the class of all algebras for which the logic MTL is sound. Furthermore, the strong completeness theorem holds:

A formula A is a global consequence in MTL of a set of formulae Γ if and only if A is derivable from Γ in MTL.

=== Linear semantics ===
Like algebras for other fuzzy logics, MTL-algebras enjoy the following linear subdirect decomposition property:

Every MTL-algebra is a subdirect product of linearly ordered MTL-algebras.

(A subdirect product is a subalgebra of the direct product such that all projection maps are surjective. An MTL-algebra is linearly ordered if its lattice order is linear.)

In consequence of the linear subdirect decomposition property of all MTL-algebras, the completeness theorem with respect to linear MTL-algebras (Esteva & Godo, 2001) holds:

- A formula is provable in MTL if and only if it is valid in all linear MTL-algebras.
- A formula A is derivable in MTL from a set of formulae Γ if and only if A is a global consequence in all linear MTL-algebras of Γ.

=== Standard semantics ===
Standard are called those MTL-algebras whose lattice reduct is the real unit interval [0, 1]. They are uniquely determined by the real-valued function that interprets strong conjunction, which can be any left-continuous t-norm $\ast$. The standard MTL-algebra determined by a left-continuous t-norm $\ast$ is usually denoted by $[0,1]_{\ast}.$ In $[0,1]_{\ast},$ implication is represented by the residuum of $\ast,$ weak conjunction and disjunction respectively by the minimum and maximum, and the truth constants zero and one respectively by the real numbers 0 and 1.

The logic MTL is complete with respect to standard MTL-algebras; this fact is expressed by the standard completeness theorem (Jenei & Montagna, 2002):

A formula is provable in MTL if and only if it is valid in all standard MTL-algebras.

Since MTL is complete with respect to standard MTL-algebras, which are determined by left-continuous t-norms, MTL is often referred to as the logic of left-continuous t-norms (similarly as BL is the logic of continuous t-norms).

== Bibliography ==
- Hájek P., 1998, Metamathematics of Fuzzy Logic. Dordrecht: Kluwer.
- Esteva F. & Godo L., 2001, "Monoidal t-norm based logic: Towards a logic of left-continuous t-norms". Fuzzy Sets and Systems 124: 271–288.
- Jenei S. & Montagna F., 2002, "A proof of standard completeness of Esteva and Godo's monoidal logic MTL". Studia Logica 70: 184–192.
- Ono, H., 2003, "Substructural logics and residuated lattices — an introduction". In F.V. Hendricks, J. Malinowski (eds.): Trends in Logic: 50 Years of Studia Logica, Trends in Logic 20: 177–212.
- Cintula P., 2005, "Short note: On the redundancy of axiom (A3) in BL and MTL". Soft Computing 9: 942.
- Cintula P., 2006, "Weakly implicative (fuzzy) logics I: Basic properties". Archive for Mathematical Logic 45: 673–704.
- Chvalovský K., 2012, "On the Independence of Axioms in BL and MTL". Fuzzy Sets and Systems 197: 123–129, doi:10.1016/j.fss.2011.10.018.
