= Hockey-stick identity =

Recurrence relations of binomial coefficients in Pascal's triangle

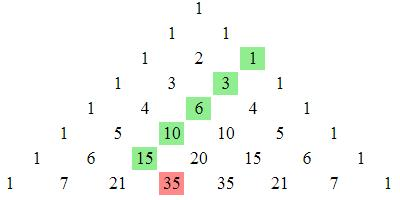
Pascal's triangle, rows 0 through 7. The hockey stick identity confirms, for example: for n=6, r=2: 1+3+6+10+15=35.

In combinatorics, the hockey-stick identity, Christmas stocking identity, boomerang identity, Fermat's identity or Chu's Theorem, states that if $n \geq r \ge 0$ are integers, then

$$\binom{r}{r} + \binom{r+1}{r} + \binom{r+2}{r} + \cdots + \binom{n}{r} = \binom{n+1}{r+1}.$$

The name stems from the graphical representation of the identity on Pascal's triangle: when the addends represented in the summation and the sum itself are highlighted, the shape revealed is vaguely reminiscent of those objects (see hockey stick, Christmas stocking).

== Formulations ==
Using sigma notation, the identity states

$$\sum^n_{i=r}{i\choose r}={n+1\choose r+1} \qquad \text{ for } n,r\in\mathbb{N}, \quad n\geq r$$

or equivalently, the mirror-image by the substitution $j\to i-r$, and by using the identify ${n\choose k}={n\choose n-k}$:

$$\sum^{n-r}_{j=0}{j+r\choose r}=\sum^{n-r}_{j=0}{j+r\choose j}={n+1\choose n-r} \qquad \text{ for } n,r\in\mathbb{N}, \quad n\geq r.$$

== Proofs ==
=== Inductive and algebraic proofs ===
The inductive and algebraic proofs both make use of Pascal's identity:

$${n \choose k}={n-1\choose k-1}+{n-1\choose k}.$$

==== Inductive proof ====
This identity can be proven by mathematical induction on $n$.

Base case Let $n=r$;

$$\sum^n_{i=r} {i\choose r} = \sum^r_{i=r}{i\choose r}={r\choose r} = 1 = {r+1\choose r+1} = {n+1\choose r+1}.$$

Inductive step Suppose, for some $k\in\mathbb{N}, k \geqslant r$,

$$\sum^k_{i=r}{i\choose r}={k+1\choose r+1}$$

Then

$$\sum^{k+1}_{i=r} {i\choose r} = \left(\sum^k_{i=r} {i\choose r} \right) + {k+1\choose r}={k+1\choose r+1}+{k+1\choose r}={k+2\choose r+1}.$$

==== Algebraic proof ====
We use a telescoping argument to simplify the computation of the sum:

$$\begin{align}
\sum_{t=\color{blue}0}^n \binom{t}{k}
=\sum_{t=\color{blue}k}^n\binom tk
&= \sum_{t=k}^n\left[ \binom {t+1}{k+1}-\binom {t}{k+1}\right]\\
&=\sum_{t=\color{green}k}^{\color{green}n}\binom {\color{green}{t+1}}{k+1} - \sum_{t=k}^n \binom t{k+1}\\
&=\sum_{t=\color{green}{k+1}}^{\color{green}{n+1}}\binom {\color{green}{t}}{k+1} - \sum_{t=k}^n \binom t{k+1}\\
&=\binom{n+1}{k+1}-\underbrace{\binom k{k+1}}_0&&\text{by telescoping}\\
&=\binom{n+1}{k+1}.
\end{align}$$

=== Combinatorial proofs ===
==== Proof 1 ====
Imagine that we are distributing $n$ indistinguishable candies to $k$ distinguishable children. By a direct application of the stars and bars method, there are

$$\binom{n+k-1}{ k-1}$$

ways to do this. Alternatively, we can first give $0\leqslant i\leqslant n$ candies to the oldest child so that we are essentially giving $n-i$ candies to $k-1$ kids and again, with stars and bars and double counting, we have

$$\binom{n+k-1}{ k-1}=\sum_{i=0}^n\binom{n+k-2-i}{k-2},$$

which simplifies to the desired result by taking $n' = n+k-2$ and $r=k-2$, and noticing that $n'-n = k-2=r$:

$$\binom{n'+1}{ r+1}=\sum_{i=0}^n \binom {n'-i}r = \sum_{i=r}^{n'} \binom {i}r .$$

==== Proof 2 ====
Count the $(k+1)$-element subsets of the set $\{1,2,\ldots,n+1\}$ in two ways.

There are clearly $\binom{n+1}{k+1}$ such subsets in total.

Alternatively, partition these subsets according to their largest element. If the largest element is $r+1$, where $k \le r \le n$, then the remaining $k$ elements must be chosen from $\{1,2,\ldots,r\}$, which can be done in $\binom{r}{k}$ ways.

Therefore,
$$\sum_{r=k}^{n}\binom{r}{k}=\binom{n+1}{k+1}.$$

=== Generating function proof ===
Let $X=1+x$. Then, by the partial sum formula for geometric series, we find that

$$X^r + X^{r+1} + \dots + X^{n} = \frac{X^r-X^{n+1}}{1-X} = \frac{X^{n+1}-X^r}{x}$$.

Further, by the binomial theorem, we also find that

$X^{r + k} = (1+x)^{r + k} = \sum_{i = 0}^{r + k} \binom{r + k}{i} x^{i}$.

Note that this means the coefficient of $x^r$ in $X^{r + k}$ is given by $\binom{r + k}{r}$.

Thus, the coefficient of $x^r$ in the left hand side of our first equation can be obtained by summing over the coefficients of $x^r$ from each term, which gives

$\sum_{k = 0}^{n-r} \binom{r + k}{r}$

Similarly, we find that the coefficient of $x^r$ on the right hand side is given by the coefficient of $x^{r + 1}$ in $X^{n+1} - X^r$, which is

$\binom{n + 1}{r + 1} - \binom{r}{r + 1} = \binom{n + 1}{r + 1}$

Therefore, we can compare the coefficients of $x^r$ on each side of the equation to find that

$\sum_{k = 0}^{n-r} \binom{r + k}{r} = \binom{n + 1}{r + 1}$

== See also ==
- Pascal's identity
- Pascal's triangle
- Leibniz triangle
- Vandermonde's identity
- Faulhaber's formula, for sums of arbitrary polynomials.
