= Mellin (surname) =

Mellin is a German surname of the noble Mellin family. Notable people with the surname include:

- Albert Mellin, Finnish architect
- Charles Mellin (1597–1649), French painter
- Hjalmar Mellin (1854–1933), Finnish mathematician
- Lena Mellin, Swedish journalist
- Ludwig August Mellin (1754–1835), Baltic German cartographer and politician
- Max Mellin (1904–1977), German art director
- Gustav Mellin, founder of Mellin's Food an early infant formula manufacturer
- Robert Mellin (1902–1994), Russian Empire-born American composer, lyricist, and music publisher
- Thomas Mellin-Olsen, Norwegian long jumper

== See also ==
- Mellin (disambiguation)
- Mellino
