= Melon (disambiguation) =

A melon is any of various plants of the family Cucurbitaceae, and their sweet, edible, fleshy fruit.

Melon may also refer to:

== Establishments ==
- J.G. Melon, a New York City restaurant
- Melon Bicycles, a folding bicycle manufacturer

== Food ==
- Melon (apple), a dessert apple
- Melon de Bourgogne, or Melon, a white grape variety

== Music ==
- Melon (band), a New York band
- The Melons, an English band
- Melon, a 1971 album by Sweetwater
- Melon: Remixes for Propaganda, a 1995 compilation album by U2
- Melon (online music service), a South Korean music streaming site and online retailer
  - Melon Music Awards
- "Melon", a spoken word piece from Ten in the Swear Jar's album Accordion Solo!, 2005

== People ==
- Jean-François Melon (1675–1738), French political economist
- Anthony Fantano (born 1985), nicknamed Melon, American music critic

== Other uses ==
- Melón, a municipality in Ourense, Spain
- Melon (cetacean), a mass of adipose tissue in the forehead of toothed whales
- Melon (chemistry), a polymeric derivative of heptazine

== See also ==
- Mellen (disambiguation)
- Mellin (disambiguation)
- Mellon (disambiguation)
- Melones (disambiguation)
- Tree melon (disambiguation)
