= Mellen =

Mellen may refer to:

== People ==
- Charles Sanger Mellen (1852–1927), American railroad executive
- Grenville Mellen (1799—1841), American poet and lawyer
- Ida Mellen (1877–1970), American ichthyologist and biologist
- James Mellen (born 1996), American cyclist
- Jim Mellen (1935–2023), American activist and academic
- Joan Mellen (1941–2025), American writer and professor of English and creative writing
- Joey Mellen (born 1939), British-born author of the book Bore Hole
- Kathleen Dickenson Mellen (1895–1969), American Hawaiian author
- Mary Blood Mellen (1819–1886), American painter
- Polly Allen Mellen (1924–2024), American stylist and fashion editor
- Prentiss Mellen (1764–1840), American politician and judge
- William H. Mellen (1829–1907), American politician
- William M. E. Mellen (1848–1906), American physician and mayor of Chicopee, Massachusetts
- Mellen Chamberlain (1821–1900), American lawyer, librarian and historian
- Mellen Clark Greeley (1880–1981), American architect

== Other ==
- Mellen Township, Michigan
- Mellen, Wisconsin
  - Mellen City Hall
- Edwin Mellen Press, academic and scholarly publications worldwide

== See also ==
- Mellin (disambiguation)
- Mellon (disambiguation)
- Melon (disambiguation)
