= Nørlund–Rice integral =

Mathematical integral

In mathematics, the Nørlund–Rice integral, sometimes called Rice's method, relates the nth forward difference of a function to a contour integral on the complex plane. It commonly appears in the theory of finite differences and has also been applied in computer science and graph theory to estimate binary tree lengths. It is named in honour of Niels Erik Nørlund and Stephen O. Rice. Nørlund's contribution was to define the integral; Rice's contribution was to demonstrate its utility by applying saddle-point techniques to its evaluation.

== Definition ==
The nth forward difference of a function f(x) is given by

$$\Delta^n[f](x)= \sum_{k=0}^n {n \choose k} (-1)^{n-k} f(x+k)$$

where ${n \choose k}$ is the binomial coefficient.

The Nørlund–Rice integral is given by

$$\sum_{k=\alpha}^n {n \choose k} (-1)^{n-k} f(k) =
\frac{n!}{2\pi i}
\oint_\gamma \frac{f(z)}{z(z-1)(z-2)\cdots(z-n)}\, dz$$

where f is understood to be meromorphic, α is an integer, $0\leq \alpha \leq n$, and the contour of integration is understood to circle the poles located at the integers α, ..., n, but encircles neither integers 0, ..., $\alpha-1$ nor any of the poles of f. The integral may also be written as

$$\sum_{k=\alpha}^n {n \choose k} (-1)^{k} f(k) =
-\frac{1}{2\pi i}
\oint_\gamma B(n+1, -z) f(z)\, dz$$

where B(a,b) is the Euler beta function. If the function $f(z)$ is polynomially bounded on the right hand side of the complex plane, then the contour may be extended to infinity on the right hand side, allowing the transform to be written as

$$\sum_{k=\alpha}^n {n \choose k} (-1)^{n-k} f(k) =
\frac{-n!}{2\pi i}
\int_{c-i\infty}^{c+i\infty} \frac{f(z)}{z(z-1)(z-2)\cdots(z-n)}\, dz$$

where the constant c is to the left of α.

== Poisson–Mellin–Newton cycle ==
The Poisson–Mellin–Newton cycle, noted by Flajolet et al. in 1985, is the observation that the resemblance of the Nørlund–Rice integral to the Mellin transform is not accidental, but is related by means of the binomial transform and the Newton series. In this cycle, let $\{f_n\}$ be a sequence, and let g(t) be the corresponding Poisson generating function, that is, let

$$g(t) = e^{-t} \sum_{n=0}^\infty \frac{t^n}{n!} f_n.$$

Taking its Mellin transform

$$\phi(s)=\int_0^\infty g(t) t^{s-1}\, dt,$$

one can then regain the original sequence by means of the Nörlund–Rice integral (see References "Mellin, seen from the sky"):

$$f_n = \frac{(-1)^n }{2\pi i}
\int_\gamma
\frac {\phi(-s)}{\Gamma(-s)} \frac{n!}{s(s-1)\cdots (s-n)}\, ds$$

where Γ is the gamma function which cancels with the gamma from Ramanujan's Master Theorem.

== Riesz mean ==
A closely related integral frequently occurs in the discussion of Riesz means. Very roughly, it can be said to be related to the Nörlund–Rice integral in the same way that Perron's formula is related to the Mellin transform: rather than dealing with infinite series, it deals with finite series.

== Utility ==
The integral representation for these types of series is interesting because the integral can often be evaluated using asymptotic expansion or saddle-point techniques; by contrast, the forward difference series can be extremely hard to evaluate numerically, because the binomial coefficients grow rapidly for large n.

== See also ==
- Table of Newtonian series
- List of factorial and binomial topics
