= Hjalmar Mellin =

Finnish mathematician (1854–1933)

- Born: 19 June 1854; Liminka, Northern Ostrobothnia, Finland
- Died: 5 April 1933 (aged 78); Helsinki, Finland
- Education: University of Helsinki (Ph.D., 1882)
- Known for: Mellin formula Mellin transform
- Spouse: Hilda Koskinen d.1909 Hilda Maria Sofia Peltola d.1927
- Children: 4 (Note: He has no children at his second marriage)
- Scientific career
- Fields: Mathematics
- Workplaces: Helsinki University of Technology
- Thesis: De algebraiska funktionerna af en oberoende variabel (1882)
- Doctoral advisor: Gösta Mittag-Leffler
- Doctoral students: Ernst Leonard Lindelöf

Robert Hjalmar Mellin (19 June 1854 – 5 April 1933) was a Finnish mathematician and function theorist.

== Biography ==
Mellin was born on June 19, 1854 to priest and a former teacher Gustaf Robert Mellin (1826-1880) and Sofia Augusta Thérmen (1821-1888) in Liminka, Northern Ostrobothnia, Finland. He was the oldest among his four siblings, He worked as a translator of his father's religious and literary works after his father's expulsion from the priesthood in 1866 because of his heavy drinking, although he was suspended in 1864 because of the same reason. Hjalmar's mother Sofia was the sister of the former Councilor of State, Karl Otto Themén (1818-1893). Mellin studied at the University of Helsinki and later in Berlin under Karl Weierstrass. He is chiefly remembered for his use of the integral transform known as the Mellin transform. He studied related gamma functions, hypergeometric functions, Dirichlet series and the Riemann ζ function. He was appointed professor at the Polytechnic Institute in Helsinki, which later became Helsinki University of Technology with Mellin as first rector.

Later in his career Mellin also became known for his critical opposition to the theory of relativity; he published several papers in which he argued against the theory from a chiefly philosophical standpoint. In his private life he was known as an outspoken fennoman: a proponent of adopting Finnish as the language of state and culture in the Grand Duchy of Finland, in preference to Swedish, which had predominantly been used hitherto.

== See also ==
- Mellin inversion theorem
- Mellin–Barnes integral
- Poisson–Mellin–Newton cycle
