= Mellon =

Mellon may refer to:

== People ==
- Mellon family, influential banking and political family originally of Pennsylvania, USA
  - Rachel Mellon Walton (1899–2006)
  - Richard Mellon Scaife (1932-2014), American publisher
  - Richard B. Mellon (1858–1933), American banker, industrialist and philanthropist
  - Richard King Mellon (1899–1970), American financier
  - Sarah Mellon (1903–1965), heiress
  - Thomas Mellon (1813–1908), Scots-Irish-American entrepreneur, lawyer, judge, founder of Mellon Bank, and patriarch of the Mellon family
  - Ailsa Mellon Bruce (1901–1969), daughter of Andrew William Mellon, philanthropist
  - Paul Mellon (1907–1999), son of Andrew William Mellon, philanthropist
  - Andrew W. Mellon (1855–1937), U.S. banker, businessman and Treasury Secretary
  - William Larimer Mellon, Sr. (1868–1949), entrepreneur
  - William Larimer Mellon, Jr. (1910–1989), a.k.a. Larry Mellon, philanthropist
  - Timothy Mellon, entrepreneur, founder of Guilford Transportation Industries
- Alfred Mellon (1820 – 24 March 1867), British composer and conductor
- Micky Mellon (born 1972), Scottish former footballer, now Manager
- Niall Mellon (born 1967), Irish philanthropist
- Pauline Mellon, Irish mathematician

== Other uses ==
- Andrew W. Mellon Foundation, private foundation with five core areas of interest, endowed with wealth accumulated by Andrew W. Mellon
- Mellon Trust, a charitable trust founded by Andrew W. Mellon
- Andrew W. Mellon Auditorium, a U.S. government-owned auditorium in Washington, D.C.'s Federal Triangle
- Carnegie Mellon University, leading university in Pittsburgh
- Mellon Institute, research institute founded by the Mellon family, merged to become Carnegie Mellon University
- Mellon College of Science, science college at Carnegie Mellon University
- Mellon Financial, a wholly owned subsidiary of The Bank of New York Mellon Corporation (BNY Mellon)
- Mellon Arena, home of the NHL Pittsburgh Penguins
- Mellon Square, Square located in Pittsburgh
- Mellon Collie and the Infinite Sadness, Smashing Pumpkin's 1995 2-disc album
- Mellon (meaning "friend") is the password to enter Moria in the novel The Lord of the Rings
- Mellon (newspaper), a Greek socialist newspaper
- Mellon: An American Life, a 2006 biography of Andrew Mellon by David Cannadine

== See also ==
- Saint Mellonius, 4th century Bishop of Rouen
- Saint Melaine, 6th century Bishop of Rennes
- Mellin (disambiguation)
- Melon (disambiguation)
