= Riesz mean =

Generalized average used for summability

In mathematics, the Riesz mean is a certain mean of the terms in a series. They were introduced by Marcel Riesz in 1911 as an improvement over the Cesàro mean. The Riesz mean should not be confused with the Bochner–Riesz mean or the Strong–Riesz mean.

== Definition ==
Given a series $\{s_n\}$, the Riesz mean of the series is defined by

$$s^\delta(\lambda) =
\sum_{n\le \lambda} \left(1-\frac{n}{\lambda}\right)^\delta s_n$$

Sometimes, a generalized Riesz mean is defined as

$$R_n = \frac{1}{\lambda_n} \sum_{k=0}^n (\lambda_k-\lambda_{k-1})^\delta s_k$$

Here, the $\lambda_n$ are a sequence with $\lambda_n\to\infty$ and with $\lambda_{n+1}/\lambda_n\to 1$ as $n\to\infty$. Other than this, the $\lambda_n$ are taken as arbitrary.

Riesz means are often used to explore the summability of sequences; typical summability theorems discuss the case of $s_n = \sum_{k=0}^n a_k$ for some sequence $\{a_k\}$. Typically, a sequence is summable when the limit $\lim_{n\to\infty} R_n$ exists, or the limit $\lim_{\delta\to 1,\lambda\to\infty}s^\delta(\lambda)$ exists, although the precise summability theorems in question often impose additional conditions.

== Special cases ==
Let $a_n=1$ for all $n$. Then

$$\sum_{n\le \lambda} \left(1-\frac{n}{\lambda}\right)^\delta
= \frac{1}{2\pi i} \int_{c-i\infty}^{c+i\infty}
\frac{\Gamma(1+\delta)\Gamma(s)}{\Gamma(1+\delta+s)} \zeta(s) \lambda^s \, ds
= \frac{\lambda}{1+\delta} + \sum_n b_n \lambda^{-n}.$$

Here, one must take $c>1$; $\Gamma(s)$ is the Gamma function and $\zeta(s)$ is the Riemann zeta function. The power series

$$\sum_n b_n \lambda^{-n}$$

can be shown to be convergent for $\lambda > 1$. Note that the integral is of the form of an inverse Mellin transform.

Another interesting case connected with number theory arises by taking $a_n=\Lambda(n)$ where $\Lambda(n)$ is the Von Mangoldt function. Then

$$\sum_{n\le \lambda} \left(1-\frac{n}{\lambda}\right)^\delta \Lambda(n)
= - \frac{1}{2\pi i} \int_{c-i\infty}^{c+i\infty}
\frac{\Gamma(1+\delta)\Gamma(s)}{\Gamma(1+\delta+s)}
\frac{\zeta^\prime(s)}{\zeta(s)} \lambda^s \, ds
= \frac{\lambda}{1+\delta} +
\sum_\rho \frac {\Gamma(1+\delta)\Gamma(\rho)}{\Gamma(1+\delta+\rho)}
+\sum_n c_n \lambda^{-n}.$$

Again, one must take c > 1. The sum over ρ is the sum over the zeroes of the Riemann zeta function, and

$$\sum_n c_n \lambda^{-n} \,$$

is convergent for λ > 1.

The integrals that occur here are similar to the Nörlund–Rice integral; very roughly, they can be connected to that integral via Perron's formula.
