= Table of Newtonian series =

In mathematics, a Newtonian series, named after Isaac Newton, is a sum over a sequence $a_n$ written in the form

$$f(s) = \sum_{n=0}^\infty (-1)^n {s\choose n} a_n = \sum_{n=0}^\infty \frac{(-s)_n}{n!} a_n$$

where

$${s \choose n}$$

is the binomial coefficient and $(s)_n$ is the falling factorial. Newtonian series often appear in relations of the form seen in umbral calculus.

== List ==
The generalized binomial theorem gives

$$(1+z)^s = \sum_{n = 0}^{\infty}{s \choose n}z^n = 1+{s \choose 1}z+{s \choose 2}z^2+\cdots.$$

A proof for this identity can be obtained by showing that it satisfies the differential equation

$$(1+z) \frac{d(1+z)^s}{dz} = s (1+z)^s.$$

The $\log$ of the gamma function, and its derivative the digamma function, can both have Newtonian series found by taking their binomial transform as sequences over the integers:

$$\begin{aligned}\log(\Gamma(s+1))&=\sum_{n=1}^\infty{s\choose n}\sum_{k=1}^n(-1)^{n-k}{n-1\choose k-1}\log(k)\\
\psi(s+1)+\gamma=H_s&=\sum_{n=1}^\infty{s\choose n}\frac{(-1)^{n-1}}n\end{aligned}$$

These are both valid in the right half-plane $\Re(s)>0$, as proven by Charles Hermite in 1900 and Moritz Abraham Stern in 1847 (see Digamma function#Newton series) respectively.

The Stirling numbers of the second kind are given by the finite sum

$$\left\{\begin{matrix} n \\ k \end{matrix}\right\}
=\frac{1}{k!}\sum_{j=0}^{k}(-1)^{k-j}{k \choose j} j^n.$$

This formula is a special case of the kth forward difference of the monomial x^{n} evaluated at x = 0:

$$\Delta^k x^n = \sum_{j=0}^{k}(-1)^{k-j}{k \choose j} (x+j)^n.$$

A related identity forms the basis of the Nörlund–Rice integral:

$$\sum_{k=0}^n {n \choose k}\frac {(-1)^{n-k}}{s-k} =
\frac{n!}{s(s-1)(s-2)\cdots(s-n)} =
\frac{\Gamma(n+1)\Gamma(s-n)}{\Gamma(s+1)}=
B(n+1,s-n),s \notin \{0,\ldots,n\}$$

where $\Gamma(x)$ is the Gamma function and $B(x,y)$ is the Beta function.

The trigonometric functions have umbral identities:

$$\sum_{n=0}^\infty (-1)^n {s \choose 2n} = 2^{s/2} \cos \frac{\pi s}{4}$$

and

$$\sum_{n=0}^\infty (-1)^n {s \choose 2n+1} = 2^{s/2} \sin \frac{\pi s}{4}$$

The umbral nature of these identities is a bit more clear by writing them in terms of the falling factorial $(s)_n$. The first few terms of the sin series are

$$s - \frac{(s)_3}{3!} +  \frac{(s)_5}{5!} - \frac{(s)_7}{7!} + \cdots$$

which can be recognized as resembling the Taylor series for sin x, with (s)_{n} standing in the place of x^{n}.

In analytic number theory it is of interest to sum

$$\!\sum_{k=0}B_k z^k,$$

where B are the Bernoulli numbers. Employing the generating function its Borel sum can be evaluated as

$$\sum_{k=0}B_k z^k= \int_0^\infty e^{-t} \frac{t z}{e^{t z}-1} \, dt= \sum_{k=1}\frac z{(k z+1)^2}.$$

The general relation gives the Newton series

$\sum_{k=0}\frac{B_k(x)}{z^k}\frac{{1-s\choose k}}{s-1}= z^{s-1}\zeta(s,x+z),$

where $\zeta$ is the Hurwitz zeta function and $B_k(x)$ the Bernoulli polynomial. The series does not converge, the identity holds formally.

Another identity is $\frac 1{\Gamma(x)}= \sum_{k=0}^\infty {x-a\choose k}\sum_{j=0}^k \frac{(-1)^{k-j}}{\Gamma(a+j)}{k\choose j},$ which converges for $x>a$. This follows from the general form of a Newton series for equidistant nodes (when it exists, i.e. is convergent)

$$f(x)=\sum_{k=0}{\frac{x-a}h \choose k} \sum_{j=0}^k (-1)^{k-j}{k\choose j}f(a+j h).$$

== See also ==
- Binomial transform
- List of factorial and binomial topics
- Nörlund–Rice integral
- Carlson's theorem
