= Melones =

Melones may refer to:

- Melones, California, U.S., a former settlement, now submerged
  - New Melones Lake
  - New Melones Dam
- Carson Hill, California, U.S., formerly known as Melones
- Melones Dam (Cuba)
- Melones Formation, a geologic formation in Puerto Rico

== See also ==
- Melon (disambiguation)
- Melone (disambiguation)
