= Mellin inversion theorem =

Theorem in complex analysis

In mathematics, the Mellin inversion formula (named after Hjalmar Mellin) tells us conditions under which the inverse Mellin transform, or equivalently the inverse two-sided Laplace transform, are defined and recover the transformed function.

== Method ==
If $\varphi(s)$ is analytic in the strip $a < \Re(s) < b$, and if it tends to zero uniformly as $\Im(s) \to \pm \infty$ for any real value $c$ between $a$ and $b$, with its integral along such a line converging absolutely, then if

$$f(x)= \{ \mathcal{M}^{-1} \varphi \} = \frac{1}{2 \pi i} \int_{c-i \infty}^{c+i \infty} x^{-s} \varphi(s)\, ds$$

we have that

$$\varphi(s)= \{ \mathcal{M} f \} = \int_0^{\infty} x^{s-1} f(x)\,dx.$$

Conversely, suppose $f(x)$ is piecewise continuous on the positive real numbers, taking a value halfway between the limit values at any jump discontinuities, and suppose the integral

$$\varphi(s)=\int_0^{\infty} x^{s-1} f(x)\,dx$$

is absolutely convergent when $a < \Re(s) < b$. Then $f$ is recoverable via the inverse Mellin transform from its Mellin transform $\varphi$. These results can be obtained by relating the Mellin transform to the Fourier transform by a change of variables and then applying an appropriate version of the Fourier inversion theorem.

== Boundedness condition ==
The boundedness condition on $\varphi(s)$ can be strengthened if $f(x)$ is continuous. If $\varphi(s)$ is analytic in the strip $a < \Re(s) < b$, and if $\vert\varphi(s)\vert < K \vert s \vert^{-2}$, where $K$ is a positive constant, then $f(x)$ as defined by the inversion integral exists and is continuous; moreover the Mellin transform of $f$ is $\varphi$ for at least $a < \Re(s) < b$.

On the other hand, if we are willing to accept an original $f$ which is a generalized function, we may relax the boundedness condition on $\varphi$ to simply make it of polynomial growth in any closed strip contained in the open strip $a < \Re(s) < b$.

We may also define a Banach space version of this theorem. If we call by $L_{\nu, p}(R^{+})$ the weighted L^{p} space of complex valued functions $f$ on the positive reals such that

$$\|f\| = \left(\int_0^\infty |x^\nu f(x)|^p\, \frac{dx}{x}\right)^{1/p} < \infty$$

where $\nu$ and $p$ are fixed real numbers with $p>1$, then if $f(x)$ is in $L_{\nu, p}(R^{+})$ with $1 < p \le 2$, then $\varphi(s)$ belongs to $L_{\nu, q}(R^{+})$ with $q = p/(p-1)$ and

$$f(x)=\frac{1}{2 \pi i} \int_{\nu-i \infty}^{\nu+i \infty} x^{-s} \varphi(s)\,ds.$$

Here functions, identical everywhere except on a set of measure zero, are identified.

Since the two-sided Laplace transform can be defined as

$$\left\{\mathcal{B} f\right\}(s) = \left\{\mathcal{M} f(- \ln x) \right\}(s) ,$$

these theorems can be immediately applied to it also.

== See also ==
- Mellin transform
- Fourier inversion theorem
- Nachbin's theorem

== General references ==
- Flajolet, P.; Gourdon, X.; Dumas, P. (1995). "Mellin transforms and asymptotics: Harmonic sums" (PDF). Theoretical Computer Science. 144 (1–2): 3–58. doi:10.1016/0304-3975(95)00002-E.
- McLachlan, N. W. (1953). Complex Variable Theory and Transform Calculus. Cambridge University Press.
- Polyanin, A. D.; Manzhirov, A. V. (1998). Handbook of Integral Equations. Boca Raton: CRC Press. ISBN 0-8493-2876-4.
- Titchmarsh, E. C. (1948). Introduction to the Theory of Fourier Integrals (Second ed.). Oxford University Press.
- Yakubovich, S. B. (1996). Index Transforms. World Scientific. ISBN 981-02-2216-5.
- Zemanian, A. H. (1968). Generalized Integral Transforms. John Wiley & Sons.
