= Dionysios Kokkinos =

Greek historian and writer

Dionysios Kokkinos (Greek: Διονύσιος Κόκκινος; 1884–1967) was a Greek historian, journalist, academic and writer.

== Early life and education ==
Kokkinos was born in Pyrgos in Elis, Greece. His father, Antonios Kokkinos, was a hagiographer, born in Amorgos, 1864. His mother, Angeliki Yiannopoulou, was born in Agoulinitsa (today Epitalio) to a family who fought in the Greek War of Independence in 1821. Although Kokkinos briefly studied medicine at the University of Athens, he ended up abandoning this path in favor of history, journalism, and literature. During his college career he published the socialist newspaper Mellon (or "Future"). When Greece entered the Balkan wars, he joined as a soldier, and a year later published 4 volumes on his impressions of it.

== Career ==
During his career, Kokkinos worked for the newspapers Akropolis, Kathimerini, Patrida, Proteifousa, Hellenic, Proia, and Ethnos, fulfilling at times the roles of chronicler, correspondent, and philological collaborator. He often published works under various pseudonyms, including "Maccabeus" and "Ariel". From October 1935 to February 1954, he directed the National Library of Greece. In 1948, the Academy of Athens awarded him the "National Excellence of Letters and Arts" and, in 1950, he was elected a member of the Class of Letters. In addition, he was a member of the board of directors of the National Theater, as well as the Actors' Labor Fund.

Kokkinos authored short stories and novels as well as history, vignettes, and theater and art criticism. He first appeared in fiction with The Last, a short story published in the magazine Numas, in 1906. His other works are: The Lady with the White Horse (1922), The Secret Nest (1924), Illigos (1932), Alexis the coachman (1934), A rifle in the blue water (1935), and Hunted by the world (1937). Kokkinos's literature mainly focuses on the life of the Athenian bourgeoisie. In addition, Kokkinos wrote a series of theatrical dialogues which were published in a volume in 1924 under the title Theater of Life. He also penned original works for the theatre. His one-act play The Lost One was performed in 1939 by Marika Kotopouli.

In 1960 he completed his definitive work, The Greek Revolution, in 6 volumes, but the fifth and final edition would not be published until after his death.
