= João Penedones =

Portuguese theoretical physicist

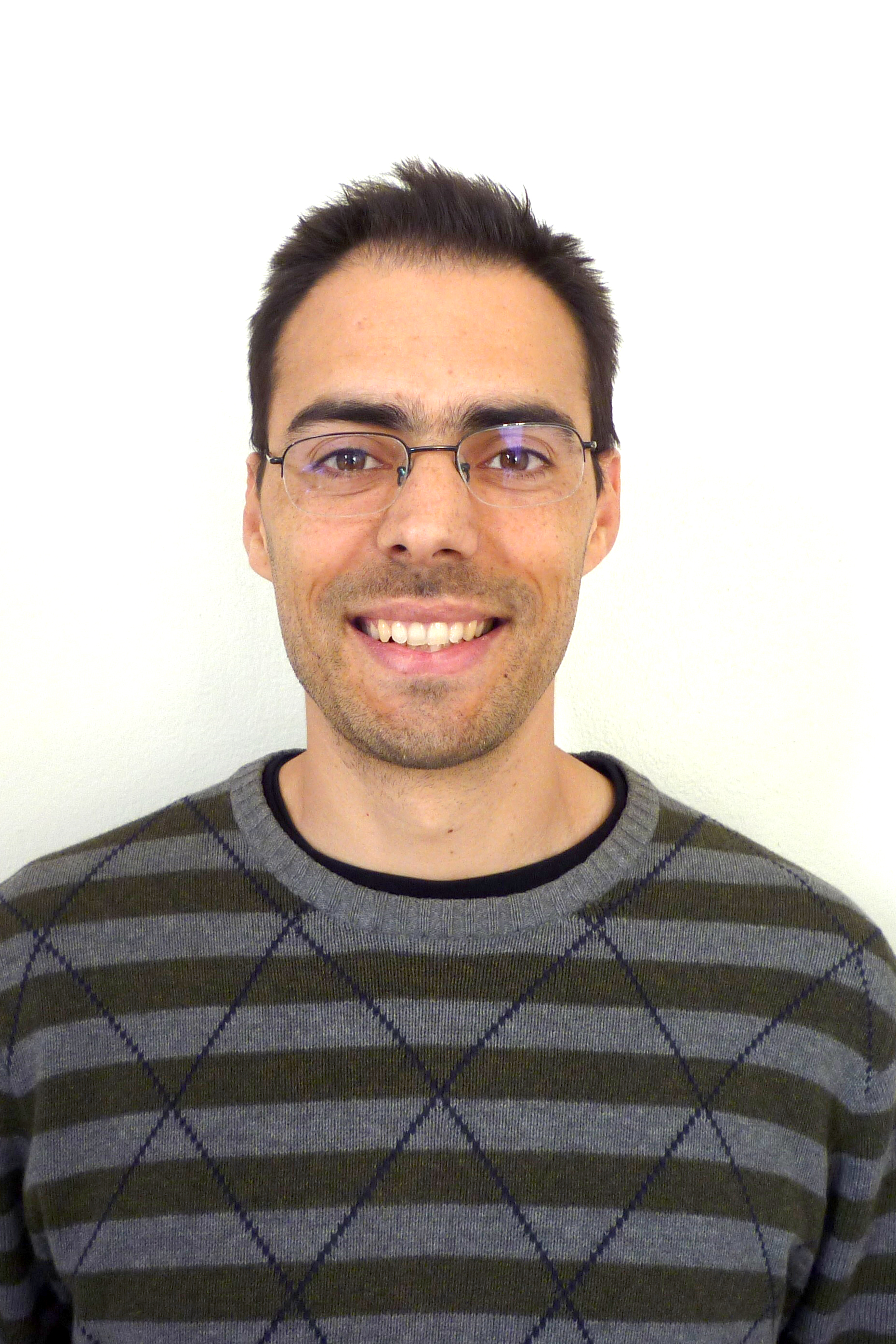
- João Penedones in 2015
- Born: August 2, 1980 (age 45)
- Citizenship: Portugal
- Scientific career
- Institutions: EPFL, Universidade do Porto
- Thesis: High Energy Scattering in the AdS/CFT Correspondence (2007)
- Doctoral advisor: Miguel Costa
- Website: https://www.epfl.ch/labs/fsl/

João Miguel Augusto Penedones Fernandes (born August 2, 1980 in Porto, Portugal) is a Portuguese theoretical physicist active in the area of quantum field theory. He is currently an associate professor at the École Polytechnique Fédérale de Lausanne (EPFL).

== Career ==
João Penedones studied physics at the University of Porto, where he obtained his undergraduate degree in 2002. He then obtained a Certificate of Advanced Studies in Mathematics from the University of Cambridge in 2003. In 2007, he got his PhD from the University of Porto, working in the field of string theory under the supervision of Miguel Costa. He then performed postdoctoral work at the Kavli Institute for Theoretical Physics (University of California, Santa Barbara) from 2008 to 2010 and at the Perimeter Institute for Theoretical Physics in Waterloo, Canada from 2010 to 2011. He then returned to the University of Porto to work as a research fellow until 2015, when he was named tenure track assistant professor at EPFL.

== Research ==
João Penedones leads the Fields and Strings Laboratory at EPFL, focusing on questions related to Quantum Field Theory and String Theory. One of their research objectives is to develop better non-perturbative methods to study quantum field theories using conformal and S-matrix bootstrap approaches. Another of their objectives is to explore the gauge/gravity duality to investigate questions related to quantum gravity.

One of João Penedones' most important contributions is a conjecture about the conditions upon which a conformal field theory has a gravity dual, later proved by A. Liam Fitzpatrick and Jared Kaplan.

Correlation functions of local operators living on the boundary of AdS are the natural analogues of scattering amplitudes. This connection is made more manifest once the correlation function is expressed in terms of Mellin amplitudes as suggested by Penedones.
