= Tree melon =

Tree melon is a term used for several melon-like fruits growing on trees or large shrubs as opposed to melons, which grow on vines:

- Carica papaya (Papaya) of the Caricaceae
- Solanum muricatum (Pepino) of the Solanaceae

Neither of these is a true melon, as those are in the Cucurbitaceae.
