= Mellon (newspaper) =

Mellon Μέλλον
- Type: Weekly newspaper
- Founder: Dionysios Kokkinos
- Founded: 1909
- City: Athens
- Country: Greece

Mellon (Greek: Μέλλον, 'Future') was a Greek-language socialist weekly newspaper, founded in 1909 by Dionysios Kokkinos. The first issue was published in March 1909, in Athens.
