= Mellino =

Mellino is an Italian surname. Notable people with the surname include:

- Esteban Mellino (1945–2008), Argentine actor
- Marco Mellino (born 1966), Italian prelate of the Catholic Church who serves as Secretary of the Council of Cardinals

== See also ==
- Mellin
