= Albert Mellin =

Finnish architect

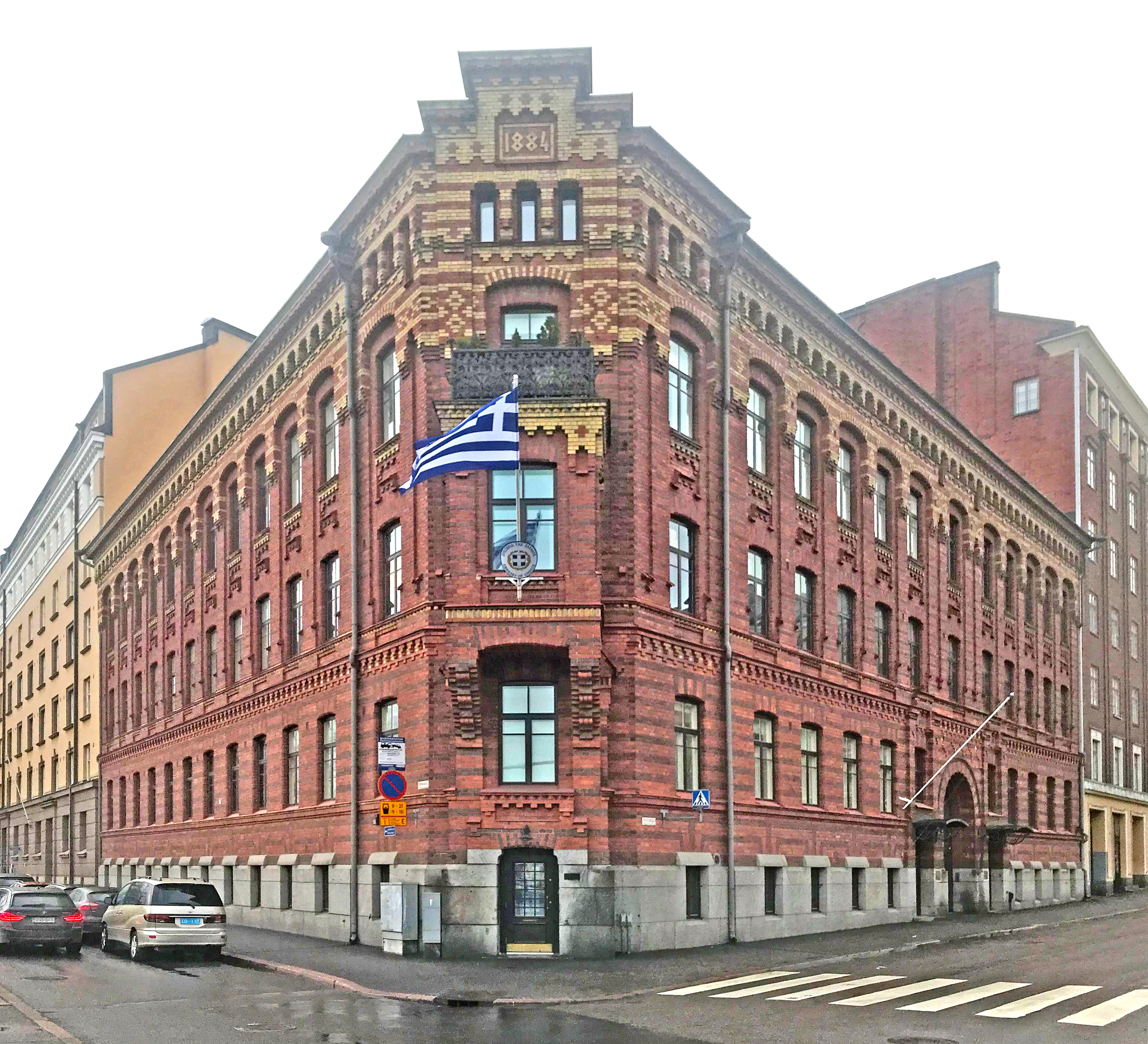
- Mellin House at Pohjoisranta 18, Helsinki
- Born: 30 January 1843; Helsinki, Grand Duchy of Finland, Russian Empire
- Died: 7 October 1886 (aged 43); Helsinki, Grand Duchy of Finland, Russian Empire
- Occupation: Architect
- Practice: apartment houses, residences, and churches in Finland
- Buildings: Mellin House; Villa Tallbo; Villa Granvik; Lahti Wooden Church

Albert Mellin (30 January 1843 – 7 October 1886) was a Finnish architect who spent most of his career in Saint Petersburg, Russia.

Albert Mellin was born in Helsinki to Roland Mellin, a goldsmith who moved to Finland from Sweden, and Sofie Könika, originally from Saint Petersburg. He graduated with an architecture degree from the Helsinki Technical Real School in 1866, and then moved to Saint Petersburg, where he also completed an architect's diploma at the Imperial Academy of Arts in 1870. He lived in Saint Petersburg for sixteen years and worked in the architectural offices of Aleksandr Rezanov, Victor Schröter, Hieronymus Küttner and Andreas Hühn, among others. During this time, he participated in design competitions, but did not carry out independent design work.

Mellin returned to Finland in 1882 and established his independent architectural practice. He designed several apartment buildings in Helsinki, the banknote printing office of the Bank of Finland (dismantled in 1957) and Villa Tallbo and Villa Granvik in Meilahti. In 1884–85 he built the so-called Mellin house, which he designed and where he himself resided, at Pohjoisranta 18 in Helsinki, which uses the kirpitšnyi stil ("brick style") common in St. Petersburg but rare in Finland. Mellin's most famous design work is probably the wooden church of Lahti, designed in 1885, but completed posthumously in 1890. It was demolished in 1977 to make way for the present Cross Church. Mellin died suddenly at the age of 43 in Helsinki.
