= Melon (apple) =

Apple cultivar

'Melon'
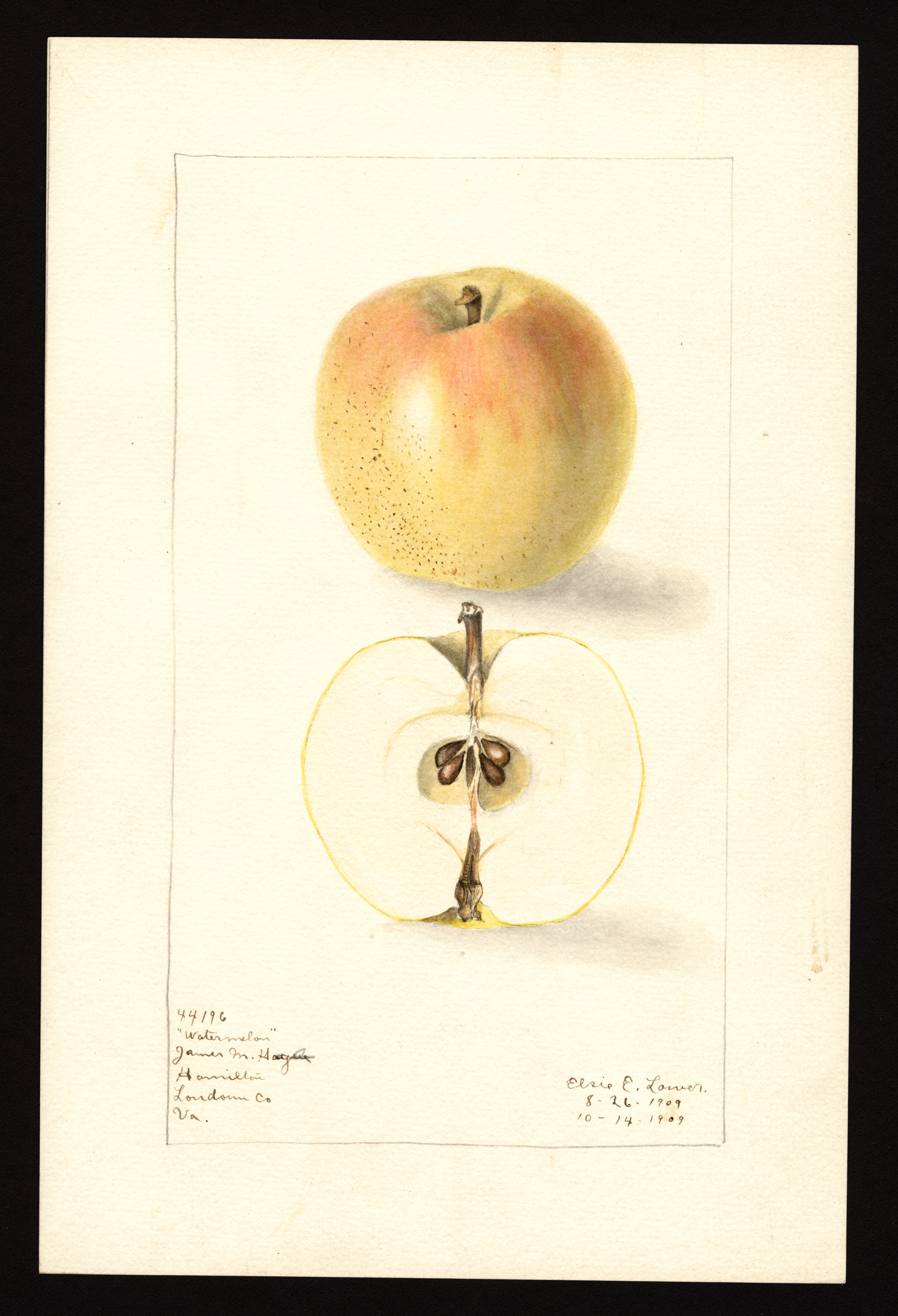
- Hybrid parentage: unknown
- Cultivar: 'Melon'
- Origin: Connecticut and later Ontario County, New York, United States, before 1800

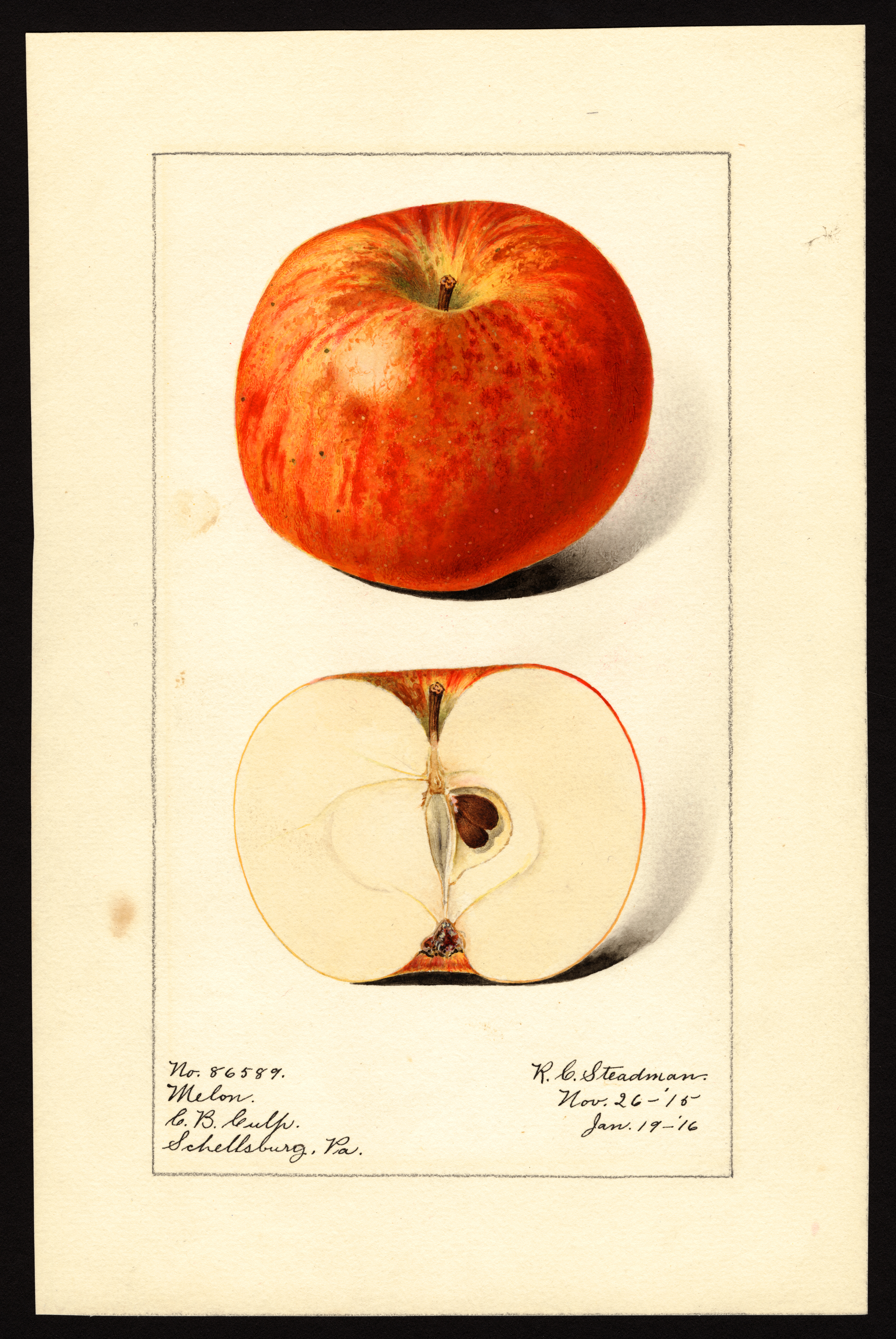

The 'Melon' apple, also called 'Watermelon' and 'Norton's Melon', is a partly red dessert apple in season from autumn through early winter. Its quality is excellent, but it does not keep well into late winter. It originated among seedling trees that were brought from Connecticut to make an orchard in New York state in 1800.
