= Mellin =

Mellin may refer to:

- Mellin, Saxony-Anhalt, village and a former municipality in the district Altmarkkreis Salzwedel, in Saxony-Anhalt, Germany.
- Mellin (surname), surname
- Mellin transform, in mathematics an integral transform

== See also ==
- Mellino
