= Perron's formula =

Formula for the sum of an arithmetic function

In mathematics, and more particularly in analytic number theory, Perron's formula is a formula discovered by Oskar Perron to calculate the sum of an arithmetic function, by means of an inverse Mellin transform.

== Statement ==
Let $\{a(n)\}$ be an arithmetic function, and let

$$g(s)=\sum_{n=1}^{\infty} \frac{a(n)}{n^{s}}$$

be the corresponding Dirichlet series. Presume the Dirichlet series to be uniformly convergent for $\Re(s)>\sigma$. Then Perron's formula is

$$A(x) = {\sum_{n\le x}}' a(n) =\frac{1}{2\pi i}\int_{c-i\infty}^{c+i\infty} g(z)\frac{x^{z}}{z} \,dz.$$

Here, the prime on the summation indicates that the last term of the sum must be multiplied by 1/2 when x is an integer. The integral is not a convergent Lebesgue integral; it is understood as the Cauchy principal value. The formula requires that c > 0, c > σ, and x > 0.

== Proof ==
An easy sketch of the proof comes from taking Abel's sum formula

$$g(s)=\sum_{n=1}^{\infty} \frac{a(n)}{n^{s} }=s\int_{1}^{\infty}  A(x)x^{-(s+1) } dx.$$

This is nothing but a Laplace transform under the variable change $x = e^t.$ Inverting it one gets Perron's formula.

Proofs of Perron's formula have been published by Tom M. Apostol and by Gérald Tenenbaum.

== Examples ==
Because of its general relationship to Dirichlet series, the formula is commonly applied to many number-theoretic sums. Thus, for example, one has the famous integral representation for the Riemann zeta function:

$$\zeta(s)=s\int_1^\infty \frac{\lfloor x\rfloor}{x^{s+1}}\,dx$$

and a similar formula for Dirichlet L-functions:

$$L(s,\chi)=s\int_1^\infty \frac{A(x)}{x^{s+1}}\,dx$$

where

$$A(x)=\sum_{n\le x} \chi(n)$$

and $\chi(n)$ is a Dirichlet character. Other examples appear in the articles on the Mertens function and the von Mangoldt function.

== Generalizations ==
Perron's formula is a special case of the formula

$$\sum_{n=1}^{\infty} a(n)f(n/x)= \frac{1}{2\pi i} \int_{c-i\infty}^{c+i\infty}F(s)G(s)x^{s}ds$$

where

$$G(s)= \sum_{n=1}^{\infty} \frac{a(n)}{n^{s}}$$

and

$$F(s)= \int_{0}^{\infty}f(x)x^{s-1}dx$$

the Mellin transform. The Perron formula is the special case of the test function $f(1/x)=\theta (x-1),$ for $\theta(x)$ the Heaviside step function.
