= Fourier inversion theorem =

Mathematical theorem about functions

In mathematics, the Fourier inversion theorem says that for many types of functions it is possible to recover a function from its Fourier transform. Intuitively it may be viewed as the statement that if we know all frequency and phase information about a wave then we may reconstruct the original wave precisely.

The theorem says that if we have a function $f:\R \to \Complex$ satisfying certain conditions, and we use the convention for the Fourier transform that

$$(\mathcal{F}f)(\xi):=\int_{\mathbb{R}} e^{-2\pi iy\cdot\xi} \, f(y)\,dy,$$

then

$$f(x)=\int_{\mathbb{R}} e^{2\pi ix\cdot\xi} \, (\mathcal{F}f)(\xi)\,d\xi.$$

In other words, the theorem says that

$$f(x)=\iint_{\mathbb{R}^2} e^{2\pi i(x-y)\cdot\xi} \, f(y)\,dy\,d\xi.$$

This last equation is called the Fourier integral theorem.

Another way to state the theorem is that if $R$ is the flip operator i.e. $(Rf)(x) := f(-x)$, then

$$\mathcal{F}^{-1}=\mathcal{F}R=R\mathcal{F}.$$

The theorem holds if both $f$ and its Fourier transform are absolutely integrable (in the Lebesgue sense) and $f$ is continuous at the point $x$. However, even under more general conditions versions of the Fourier inversion theorem hold. In these cases the integrals above may not converge in an ordinary sense.

== Statement ==
In this section we assume that $f$ is an integrable continuous function. Use the convention for the Fourier transform that

$$(\mathcal{F}f)(\xi):=\int_{\mathbb{R}} e^{-2\pi iy\cdot\xi} \, f(y)\,dy.$$

Furthermore, we assume that the Fourier transform is also integrable.

=== Inverse Fourier transform as an integral ===
The most common statement of the Fourier inversion theorem is to state the inverse transform as an integral. For any integrable function $g$ and all $x \in \mathbb R$ set

$$\mathcal{F}^{-1}g(x):=\int_{\mathbb{R}} e^{2\pi ix\cdot\xi} \, g(\xi)\,d\xi.$$

Then for all $x \in \mathbb R$ we have

$$\mathcal{F}^{-1}(\mathcal{F}f)(x)=f(x).$$

Proof

Given $f(y)$ and $\mathcal{F}f (\xi) = \int_{\mathbb{R}^n} e^{-2\pi i y\cdot\xi} f(y)\,dy$, the proof uses the following facts:

1. If $x \in \mathbb R^n$ and $g(\xi) = e^{2 \pi \mathrm{i}x \cdot \xi} \psi(\xi)$, then $(\mathcal{F}g)(y) = (\mathcal{F}\psi)(y - x)$.
2. If $\varepsilon \in \mathbb R$ and $\psi(\xi) = \varphi(\varepsilon\xi)$, then $(\mathcal{F}\psi)(y) = (\mathcal{F}\varphi)(y/\varepsilon)/ \vert \varepsilon \vert^n$.
3. For $f, g \in L^1(\mathbb R^n)$, Fubini's theorem implies $\textstyle\int g(\xi) \cdot (\mathcal{F}f)(\xi)\,d\xi = \int(\mathcal{F}g)(y) \cdot f(y)\,dy$.
4. Define $\varphi(\xi) = e^{-\pi \vert \xi \vert^2}$ such that $(\mathcal{F}\varphi)(y) = \varphi(y)$.
5. Define $\varphi_\varepsilon(y) = \varphi(y/\varepsilon)/\varepsilon^n$; an approximation to the identity. That is, $\lim_{\varepsilon \to 0} (\varphi_\varepsilon \ast f)(x) = f(x)$ converges pointwise for any continuous $f \in L^1(\mathbb R^n)$ and point $x \in \mathbb R^n$.

Since, by assumption, $\mathcal{F}f\in L^1(\mathbb{R}^n)$, it follows by the dominated convergence theorem that
$$\int_{\mathbb{R}^n} e^{2\pi i x\cdot\xi}(\mathcal{F}f)(\xi)\,d\xi = \lim_{\varepsilon \to 0}\int_{\mathbb{R}^n} e^{-\pi\varepsilon^2|\xi|^2 + 2\pi i x\cdot\xi}(\mathcal{F}f)(\xi)\,d\xi.$$
Define $g_x(\xi) = e^{-\pi\varepsilon^2\vert \xi \vert^2 + 2 \pi \mathrm{i} x \cdot \xi}$. Applying facts 1, 2 and 4, repeatedly for multiple integrals if necessary, we obtain
$$(\mathcal{F}g_x)(y) = \frac{1}{\varepsilon^n}e^{-\frac{\pi}{\varepsilon^2}|x - y|^2}=\varphi_\varepsilon(x-y).$$
Using fact 3 on $f$ and $g_x$, for each $x\in\mathbb R^n$, we have
$$\int_{\mathbb{R}^n} e^{-\pi\varepsilon^2|\xi|^2 + 2\pi i x\cdot\xi}(\mathcal{F}f)(\xi)\,d\xi = \int_{\mathbb{R}^n} \frac{1}{\varepsilon^n}e^{-\frac{\pi}{\varepsilon^2}|x - y|^2} f(y)\,dy = (\varphi_\varepsilon * f)(x),$$
the convolution of $f$ with an approximate identity. But since $f \in L^1(\mathbb R^n)$, fact 5 says that
$$\lim_{\varepsilon\to 0}(\varphi_{\varepsilon} * f) (x) = f(x).$$
Putting together the above we have shown that
$$\int_{\mathbb{R}^n} e^{2\pi i x\cdot\xi}(\mathcal{F}f)(\xi)\,d\xi = f(x). \qquad\square$$

=== Fourier integral theorem ===
The theorem can be restated as

$$f(x)=\int_{\mathbb{R}} \int_{\mathbb{R}} e^{2\pi i(x-y)\cdot\xi} \, f(y)\,dy\,d\xi.$$

By taking the real part of each side of the above we obtain

$$f(x)=\int_{\mathbb{R}} \int_{\mathbb{R}} \cos (2\pi (x-y)\cdot\xi) \, f(y)\,dy\,d\xi.$$

=== Inverse transform in terms of flip operator ===
For any function $g$ define the flip operator $R$ by

$$Rg(x):=g(-x).$$

Then we may instead define

$$\mathcal{F}^{-1}f := R\mathcal{F}f = \mathcal{F}Rf.$$

It is immediate from the definition of the Fourier transform and the flip operator that both $R\mathcal{F}f$ and $\mathcal{F}Rf$ match the integral definition of $\mathcal{F}^{-1}f$, and in particular are equal to each other and satisfy $\mathcal{F}^{-1}(\mathcal{F}f)(x)=f(x)$.

Since $Rf=R\mathcal{F}^{-1}\mathcal{F}f = RR \mathcal{FF}f = \mathcal{F}^2f$ we have $R=\mathcal{F}^2$ and $\mathcal{F}^{-1}=\mathcal{F}^3$.

=== Two-sided inverse ===
The form of the Fourier inversion theorem stated above, as is common, is that

$$\mathcal{F}^{-1}(\mathcal{F}f)(x) = f(x).$$

In other words, $\mathcal{F}^{-1}$ is a left inverse for the Fourier transform. However it is also a right inverse for the Fourier transform i.e.

$$\mathcal{F}(\mathcal{F}^{-1}f)(\xi) = f(\xi).$$

Since $\mathcal{F}^{-1}$ is so similar to $\mathcal{F}$, this follows very easily from the Fourier inversion theorem (changing variables $\zeta := -\xi$):

$$\begin{align}
f & =\mathcal{F}^{-1}(\mathcal{F}f)(x)\\[6pt]
& =\int_{\mathbb{R}}\int_{\mathbb{R}}e^{2\pi ix\cdot\xi}\,e^{-2\pi iy\cdot\xi}\, f(y)\, dy\, d\xi\\[6pt]
& =\int_{\mathbb{R}}\int_{\mathbb{R}}e^{-2\pi ix\cdot\zeta}\,e^{2\pi iy\cdot\zeta}\, f(y)\, dy\, d\zeta\\[6pt]
& =\mathcal{F}(\mathcal{F}^{-1}f)(x).
\end{align}$$

Alternatively, this can be seen from the relation between $\mathcal{F}^{-1}f$ and the flip operator and the associativity of function composition, since

$$f = \mathcal{F}^{-1}(\mathcal{F}f) = \mathcal{F}R\mathcal{F}f = \mathcal{F} (\mathcal{F}^{-1}f).$$

== Conditions on the function ==
When used in physics and engineering, the Fourier inversion theorem is often used under the assumption that everything "behaves nicely". In mathematics such heuristic arguments are not permitted, and the Fourier inversion theorem includes an explicit specification of what class of functions is being allowed. However, there is no "best" class of functions to consider so several variants of the Fourier inversion theorem exist, albeit with compatible conclusions.

=== Schwartz functions ===
The Fourier inversion theorem holds for all Schwartz functions (roughly speaking, smooth functions that decay quickly and whose derivatives of all orders decay quickly). This condition has the benefit that it is an elementary direct statement about the function (as opposed to imposing a condition on its Fourier transform), and the integral that defines the Fourier transform and its inverse are absolutely integrable. This version of the theorem is used in the proof of the Fourier inversion theorem for tempered distributions (see below).

=== Integrable functions with integrable Fourier transform ===
The Fourier inversion theorem holds for all continuous functions that are absolutely integrable (i.e. $L^1(\mathbb R^n)$) with absolutely integrable Fourier transform. This includes all Schwartz functions, so is a strictly stronger form of the theorem than the previous one mentioned. This condition is the one used above in the statement section.

A slight variant is to drop the condition that the function $f$ be continuous but still require that it and its Fourier transform be absolutely integrable. Then $f = g$ almost everywhere where g is a continuous function, and $\mathcal{F}^{-1}(\mathcal{F}f)(x)=g(x)$ for every $x \in \mathbb R^n$.

=== Integrable functions in one dimension ===
Piecewise smooth; one dimension

If the function is absolutely integrable in one dimension (i.e. $f \in L^1(\mathbb R)$) and is piecewise smooth then a version of the Fourier inversion theorem holds. In this case we define

$$\mathcal{F}^{-1}g(x):=\lim_{R\to\infty}\int_{-R}^R e^{2\pi ix\xi}\,g(\xi)\,d\xi.$$

Then for all $x \in \mathbb R$

$$\mathcal{F}^{-1}(\mathcal{F}f)(x) = \frac{1}{2}(f(x_-) + f(x_+)),$$

i.e. $\mathcal{F}^{-1}(\mathcal{F}f)(x)$ equals the average of the left and right limits of $f$ at $x$. At points where $f$ is continuous this simply equals $f(x)$.

A higher-dimensional analogue of this form of the theorem also holds, but according to Folland (1992) is "rather delicate and not terribly useful".

Piecewise continuous; one dimension

If the function is absolutely integrable in one dimension (i.e. $f \in L^1(\mathbb R)$) but merely piecewise continuous then a version of the Fourier inversion theorem still holds. In this case the integral in the inverse Fourier transform is defined with the aid of a smooth rather than a sharp cut off function; specifically we define

$$\mathcal{F}^{-1}g(x):=\lim_{R\to\infty}\int_{\mathbb{R}} \varphi(\xi/R)\,e^{2\pi ix\xi}\,g(\xi)\,d\xi,\qquad\varphi(\xi):=e^{-\xi^2}.$$

The conclusion of the theorem is then the same as for the piecewise smooth case discussed above.

Continuous; any number of dimensions

If $f$ is continuous and absolutely integrable on $\mathbb R^n$ then the Fourier inversion theorem still holds so long as we again define the inverse transform with a smooth cut off function i.e.

$$\mathcal{F}^{-1}g(x):=\lim_{R\to\infty}\int_{\mathbb{R}^n} \varphi(\xi/R)\,e^{2\pi ix\cdot\xi}\,g(\xi)\,d\xi,\qquad\varphi(\xi):=e^{-\vert\xi\vert^2}.$$

The conclusion is now simply that for all $x \in \mathbb R^n$

$$\mathcal{F}^{-1}(\mathcal{F}f)(x)=f(x).$$

No regularity condition; any number of dimensions

If we drop all assumptions about the (piecewise) continuity of $f$ and assume merely that it is absolutely integrable, then a version of the theorem still holds. The inverse transform is again defined with the smooth cut off, but with the conclusion that

$$\mathcal{F}^{-1}(\mathcal{F}f)(x) = f(x)$$

for almost every $x \in \mathbb R^n$.

=== Square-integrable functions ===
In this case the Fourier transform cannot be defined directly as an integral since it may not be absolutely convergent, so it is instead defined by a density argument (see Fourier transform § On Lp spaces). For example, putting

$$g_k(\xi):=\int_{\{y\in\mathbb{R}^n:\left\vert y\right\vert\leq k\}} e^{-2\pi iy\cdot\xi} \, f(y)\,dy,\qquad k\in\mathbb{N},$$

we can set $\textstyle\mathcal{F}f := \lim_{k\to\infty}g_k$ where the limit is taken in the $L^2$-norm. The inverse transform may be defined by density in the same way or by defining it in terms of the Fourier transform and the flip operator. We then have

$$f(x)=\mathcal{F}(\mathcal{F}^{-1}f)(x)=\mathcal{F}^{-1}(\mathcal{F}f)(x)$$

in the mean squared norm. In one dimension (and one dimension only), it can also be shown that it converges for almost every $x \isin \mathbb{R}$. This is Carleson's theorem, but is much harder to prove than convergence in the mean squared norm.

=== Tempered distributions ===
The Fourier transform may be defined on the space of tempered distributions $\mathcal{S}'(\mathbb{R}^n)$ by duality of the Fourier transform on the space of Schwartz functions. Specifically for $f\in\mathcal{S}'(\mathbb{R}^n)$ and for all test functions $\varphi\in\mathcal S(\mathbb{R}^n)$ we set

$$\langle \mathcal{F}f,\varphi\rangle := \langle f,\mathcal{F}\varphi\rangle,$$

where $\mathcal{F}\varphi$ is defined using the integral formula. If $f \in L^1(\mathbb R^n) \cap L^2(\mathbb R^n)$ then this agrees with the usual definition. We may define the inverse transform $\mathcal{F}^{-1} : \mathcal{S}'(\mathbb{R}^n)\to\mathcal{S}'(\mathbb{R}^n)$, either by duality from the inverse transform on Schwartz functions in the same way, or by defining it in terms of the flip operator (where the flip operator is defined by duality). We then have

$$\mathcal{F}\mathcal{F}^{-1} = \mathcal{F}^{-1}\mathcal{F} = \operatorname{Id}_{\mathcal{S}'(\mathbb{R}^n)}.$$

== Relation to Fourier series ==
The Fourier inversion theorem is analogous to the convergence of Fourier series. In the Fourier transform case we have

$$f:\mathbb{R}^n\to\mathbb{C},\quad\hat f:\mathbb{R}^n\to\mathbb{C},$$
$$\hat f(\xi):=\int_{\mathbb{R}^n} e^{-2\pi iy\cdot\xi} \, f(y)\,dy,$$
$$f(x)=\int_{\mathbb{R}^n} e^{2\pi ix\cdot\xi} \, \hat f(\xi)\,d\xi.$$

In the Fourier series case we instead have

$$f:[0,1]^n\to\mathbb{C},\quad\hat f:\mathbb{Z}^n\to\mathbb{C},$$
$$\hat f(k):=\int_{[0,1]^n} e^{-2\pi iy\cdot k} \, f(y)\,dy,$$
$$f(x)=\sum_{k\in\mathbb{Z}^n} e^{2\pi ix\cdot k} \, \hat f(k).$$

In particular, in one dimension $k \in \mathbb Z$ and the sum runs from $- \infty$ to $\infty$.

== Applications ==
Some problems, such as certain differential equations, become easier to solve when the Fourier transform is applied. In that case the solution to the original problem is recovered using the inverse Fourier transform.

In applications of the Fourier transform the Fourier inversion theorem often plays a critical role. In many situations the basic strategy is to apply the Fourier transform, perform some operation or simplification, and then apply the inverse Fourier transform.

More abstractly, the Fourier inversion theorem is a statement about the Fourier transform as an operator (see Fourier transform § Fourier transform on function spaces). For example, the Fourier inversion theorem on $f \in L^2(\mathbb R^n)$ shows that the Fourier transform is a unitary operator on $L^2(\mathbb R^n)$.

== See also ==
- Rigged Hilbert space
- Wave packet
