= List of Indian mathematicians =

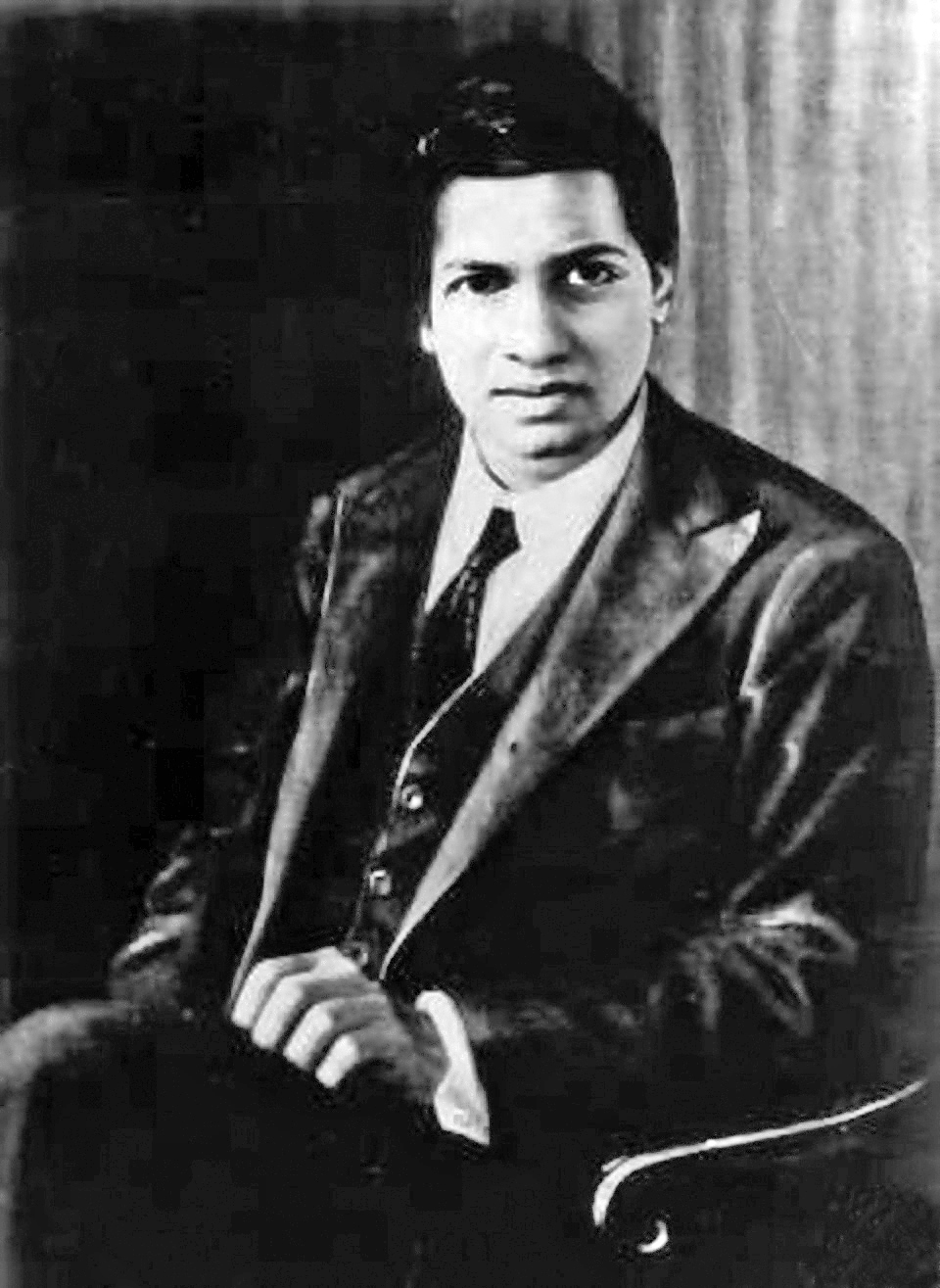
Srinivasa Ramanujan

Indian mathematicians have made a number of contributions to mathematics that have significantly influenced scientists and mathematicians in the modern era. One of such works is Hindu numeral system which is predominantly used today and is likely to be used in the future.

== Ancient (Before 320 CE) ==
- Shulba sutras (around 1st millennium BCE)
- Baudhayana sutras (fl. c. 900 BCE)
- Yajnavalkya (700 BCE)
- Manava (fl. 750–650 BCE)
- Apastamba Dharmasutra (c. 600 BCE)
- Pāṇini (c. 520–460 BCE)
- Kātyāyana (fl. c. 300 BCE)
- Akṣapada Gautama(c. 600 BCE–200 CE)
- Bharata Muni (200 BCE-200 CE)
- Pingala (c. 3rd/2nd century BCE)
- Bhadrabahu (367 – 298 BCE)
- Umasvati (c. 200 CE)
- Yavaneśvara (2nd century)
- Vasishtha Siddhanta, 4th century CE

== Classical (320 CE–520 CE) ==
- Vasishtha Siddhanta, 4th century CE
- Aryabhata (476–550 CE)
- Yativrsabha (500–570)
- Varahamihira (505–587 CE)
- Virahanka (6th century CE)

== Early Medieval Period (521 CE–1206 CE) ==
- Brahmagupta (598–670 CE)
- Bhaskara I (600–680 CE)
- Shridhara (between 650 and 850 CE)
- Lalla (c. 720–790 CE)
- Virasena (792–853 CE)
- Govindasvāmi (c. 800 – c. 860 CE)
- Prithudaka (c. 830 – c. 900CE)
- Śaṅkaranārāyaṇa, (c. 840 – c. 900 CE)
- Vaṭeśvara (born 880 CE)
- Mahavira (9th century CE)
- Jayadeva 9th century CE
- Aryabhata II (920 – c. 1000)
- Mañjula (astronomer) (born 932)
- Vijayanandi (c. 940–1010)
- Halayudha 10th Century
- Bhoja (c. 990-1055 CE)
- Śrīpati (1019–1066)
- Abhayadeva Suri (1050 CE)
- Brahmadeva (1060–1130)
- Pavuluri Mallana (11th century CE)
- Hemachandra (1087–1172 CE)
- Bhaskara II (1114–1185 CE)
- Someshvara III (1127–1138 CE)
- Śārṅgadeva (1175–1247)

== Late Medieval Period (1206–1526) ==
=== 13th Century ===
- Thakkar Pheru( 1291– 1347)

=== 14th century ===
- Mahendra Suri (1340 – 1400)
- Narayana Pandita (1325–1400)
- Makaranda (fl. 1438–1478)
- Keshava of Nandigrama (fl. 1496–1507)

==== Navya-Nyāya (Neo-Logical) School ====
- Gangesha Upadhyaya (first half of the 14th century)

==== Kerala School of Mathematics and Astronomy ====
- Madhava of Sangamagrama (c. 1340 – c. 1425)
- Parameshvara (1360–1455), discovered drek-ganita, a mode of astronomy based on observations

=== 15th century ===
==== Kerala School of Mathematics and Astronomy ====
- Chennas Narayanan Namboodiripad (born 1428)
- Nilakantha Somayaji (1444–1545), mathematician and astronomer
- Damodara (15th century)

==== Navya-Nyāya (Neo-Logical) School ====
- Raghunatha Siromani (1475–1550)

== Early Modern Period (1527– 1800) ==
=== 16th Century ===
- Gaṇeśa Daivajna (born 1507, fl. 1520–1554)

==== Kerala School of Mathematics and Astronomy ====
- Chitrabhanu (16th Century)
- Shankara Variyar (c. 1530)
- Jyeshtadeva (1500–1610), author of Yuktibhāṣā
- Paarangot Jyeshtadevan Namboodiri (AD 1500–1610)
- Achyuta Pisharati (1550–1621), mathematician and astronomer
- Melpathur Narayana Bhattathiri (1560–1646/1666)

==== Golagrama school of astronomy ====
- Nṛsiṃha (born 1586)
- Mallari (fl.1575)

=== 17th Century ===
- Kṛṣṇa Daivajña (17th century)
- Ataullah Rashidi (17th century)
- Munishvara (born 1603)
- Mulla Jaunpuri (1606–1651)
- Puthumana Somayaji (c. 1660–1740)

==== Golagrama school of astronomy ====
- Kamalakara (1616 – 1700)
- Divākara (born 1606)

=== 18th Century ===
- Jagannatha Samrat (1652–1744)
- Jai Singh II (1681 – 1743)

Kerala School of Mathematics and Astronomy

- Sankara Varman (1774–1839)

== Modern (1800–Present) ==
=== 19th century ===
- Radhanath Sikdar (1813–1870)
- Ramchandra Lal (1821–1880)
- Pathani Samanta (1835–1904)
- Jadav Chandra Chakravarti (1855–1920)
- Ashutosh Mukherjee (1864–1924)
- Ganesh Prasad (1876–1935)
- Swami Bharati Krishna Tirtha (1884–1960)
- Srinivasa Ramanujan (1887–1920)
- A. A. Krishnaswami Ayyangar (1892–1953)
- Prasanta Chandra Mahalanobis (1893–1972)
- Dinanath Atmaram Dalvi (1844–1897)
- Syamadas Mukhopadhyaya (1866-1937)
- Rahmat Ali Rahmat (1891-1963)

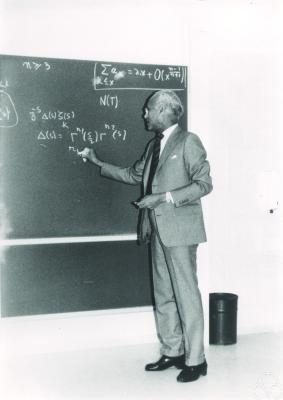
Indian mathematician Komaravolu Chandrasekhar in Vienna, 1987

=== 20th century ===
- Subbayya Sivasankaranarayana Pillai (1901–1950)
- Raj Chandra Bose (1901–1987)
- Tirukkannapuram Vijayaraghavan (1902–1955)
- Dattaraya Ramchandra Kaprekar (1905–1986)
- Damodar Dharmananda Kosambi (1907–1966)
- Lakkoju Sanjeevaraya Sharma (1907–1998)
- Sarvadaman Chowla (1907–1995)
- Subrahmanyan Chandrasekhar (1910–1995)
- Subbaramiah Minakshisundaram (1913–1968)
- P Kesava Menon (1917–1979)
- S. S. Shrikhande (1917–2020)
- Prahalad Chunnilal Vaidya (1918–2010)
- Anil Kumar Gain (1919–1978)
- Calyampudi Radhakrishna Rao (1920–2023)
- Mathukumalli V. Subbarao (1921–2006)
- Harish-Chandra (1923–1983)
- P. K. Srinivasan (1924–2005)
- Raghu Raj Bahadur (1924–1997)
- Madan Lal Puri (born 1929)
- Shreeram Shankar Abhyankar(1930–2012)
- C. S. Seshadri (1932–2020)
- Daya-Nand Verma (1933–2010)
- M. S. Narasimhan (1932–2021)
- J. N. Srivastava (1933–2010)
- Srinivasacharya Raghavan (1934–2014)
- K. S. S. Nambooripad (1935–2020)
- Ramaiyengar Sridharan (born 1935)
- Vinod Johri (1935–2014)
- Karamat Ali Karamat (1936–2022)
- K. R. Parthasarathy (1936–2023)
- S. N. Seshadri (1937–1986)
- Ramdas L. Bhirud (1937–1997)
- S. Ramanan (born 1937)
- Pranab K. Sen (1937–2023)
- Veeravalli S. Varadarajan (1937–2019)
- Jayanta Kumar Ghosh (1937–2017)
- Raghavan Narasimhan (1937–2015)
- C. P. Ramanujam (1938–1974)
- V. N. Bhat (1938–2009)
- S. R. Srinivasa Varadhan (born 1940)
- M. S. Raghunathan (born 1941)
- Ravindra Shripad Kulkarni (born 1942)
- Vashishtha Narayan Singh (1942–2019)
- C. R. Rao (1920–2023)
- Thiruvenkatachari Parthasarathy (1940–2023)
- S. B. Rao (born 1943)
- Phoolan Prasad (born 1944)
- Gopal Prasad (born 1945)
- Rajagopalan Parthasarathy (born 1945)
- Vijay Kumar Patodi (1945–1976)
- Vikram Bhagvandas Mehta (1946–2014)
- S. G. Dani (born 1947)
- Raman Parimala (born 1948)
- Singhi Navin M. (born 1949)
- Sujatha Ramdorai (born 1962)
- R. Balasubramanian (born 1951)
- M. Ram Murty (born 1953)
- Alok Bhargava (born 1954)
- Madhav V. Nori (born 1954)
- Rattan Chand (born 1955)
- Gadadhar Misra (born 1956)
- V. Kumar Murty (born 1956)
- Rajendra Bhatia (born 1952)
- Narendra Karmarkar (born 1957)
- T. N. Venkataramana (born 1958)
- Dipendra Prasad (born 1960)
- Dinesh Thakur (born 1961)
- Manindra Agrawal (born 1966)
- Madhu Sudan (born 1966)
- Suresh Venapally (born 1966)
- Chandrashekhar Khare (born 1968)
- U. S. R. Murty
- L. Mahadevan (born 1965)
- Kapil Hari Paranjape (born 1960)
- Vijay Vazirani (born 1957)
- Umesh Vazirani (born 1959)
- Prasad V. Tetali (born 1964)
- Mahan Mj (born 1968)
- Rahul Pandharipande (born 1969)
- Santosh Vempala (born 1971)
- Kannan Soundararajan (born 1973)
- Kiran Kedlaya (born 1974)
- Manjul Bhargava (born 1974)
- M.P.Chaudhary (born 1975)
- Ritabrata Munshi (born 1976)
- Amit Garg (born 1978)
- Subhash Khot (born 1978)
- Sourav Chatterjee (born 1979)
- Akshay Venkatesh (born 1981)
- Sucharit Sarkar (born 1983)
- Neena Gupta (born 1984)
- Bhargav Bhatt (born 1983)

== See also ==
- List of Indian scientists
- List of Indian astronauts
- List of mathematicians
