= NMTC =

NMTC may refer to:

- New Markets Tax Credit Program
- New Media Technology College
- North Metro Technical College
- National Mathematics Talent Contest, a national-level mathematics competition in India
