= Chinawal =

Village in Maharashtra, India

- Village
- Location in Maharashtra, India Chinawal (India)
- Coordinates: 21.1964°N 75.9261°E
- Country: India
- State: Maharashtra
- District: Jalgaon district

Government
  - Sarpanch: Mrs. Bhavna Tai Borole

Area
  - Total: 1.05 km^{2} (0.41 sq mi)
- Elevation: 246 m (807 ft)

Population (2011)
  - Total: 11,747
  - Density: 11,000/km^{2} (28,000/sq mi)

Languages
  - Official: Khandeshi, Hindi, Marathi
- Time zone: UTC+5:30 (IST)
- PIN: 425505
- Telephone code: 91-2584
- Vehicle registration: MH-19
- Sex ratio: 901 ♂/♀
- Literacy: 84.25%%

Chinawal is a village in the Jalgaon district of Maharashtra state, India, in the foothills of the Satpura range with a generally hot and dry climate.

The local environment includes neem trees, tree squirrels and graculas in and around the village.

== Geography ==
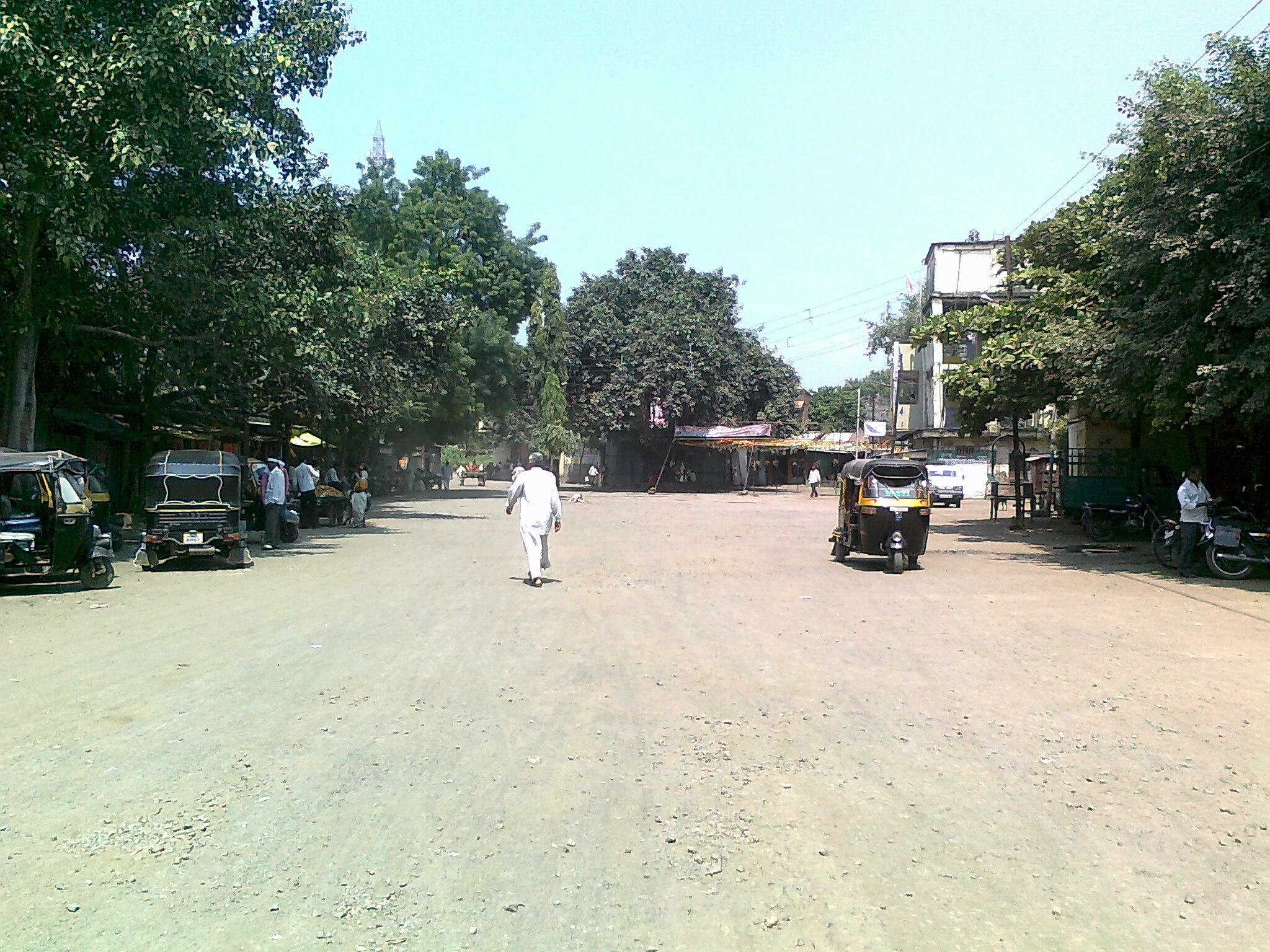
A bus and auto rickshaw stop.

Chinawal village is located at 21.1962°N 75.9267°E in Raver tahsil and Jalgaon district of Maharashtra state of India. It has an average elevation of 246 metres (810 feet) from the sea level. It is situated at the foothills of Satpura range which is in the north-east region of Deccan Traps and Khandesh. Landscape surrounding village is approximately flat, free of dikes and hills. The loam to clayey soil is of volcanic origin which contain poor to moderate organic carbon and nitrogen, poor amount of phosphorus and high to very high amount of potassium. Level of soil salinity and alkalinity is very low, hence non-agricultural land is almost non-existent. Such volcanic ash rich soil is well-suited for the cultivation of cotton and banana crops. Naturally occurring neem trees are often grown in controlled way for the shade in hot summer. Landscape of Chinawal village, street sides and borders of the farm lands are chiefly dotted with these neem trees.

== Administration ==
In August 2011, many farmers from the villages of Yamunanagar and Kernal districts in Haryana visited the Chinawal village on behalf of the government of Haryana to study its agricultural production.

In April 2013, Chinawal received an award under 'Mahatma Gandhi Tantamukt Gaon Mohim' (Mahatma Gandhi Dispute-Free Village Mission) for the year 2011–12 from the government of Maharashtra.

In 2012, Jalgaon district health officials declared water from 36 villages as 'unsafe for drinking', which included drinking water sampled from Chinawal, due to general unhygienic conditions in and around villages which included mixing of the animal and human waste in the drinking water supply chain for reasons including lack of cleanliness and open defecation, excessive use of fertilizers on the farms. Illegal sale of Alcoholic beverages, including country wine, is rampant in and around Chinawal even on dry days and some time teenage workers are employed to smuggle wine bottles.

The job of road construction and repair falls under zilla parishad. Despite repeated complaints to the representatives of the Raver region, the condition of roads leading to Chinawal and other villages is poor, affecting transport of the banana production and overall economy of the village. The job of electricity supply falls under the Government of Maharashtra. Villagers and farmers suffer due to many hours of daily power loadshedding. Farmers can not irrigate their farms regularly and it affects agricultural production. Sometime sand is illegally smuggled from the bed of the Suki river which is near the village, but when it is legally sold, gram panchayat of the Chinawal village do not receive its 10% share in the income regularly from the state government and it affects the development work of the village.

=== Health ===
The village has a Primary Health Centre and ambulance run by the state government. There is no private hospital with modern facilities for emergency treatment. In 2013, Maharashtra's state government launched Rajiv Gandhi Jeevandayee Arogya Yojana for free medicare to poor people of the state of Maharashtra. Under this scheme, people receive free treatment in the selected hospitals at district places for 975 types of diseases and surgeries and govt bears cost of it up to Rs.1,50,000 per year per family.

=== Elections ===
Gram panchayat elections

Year	Sarpanch	Deputy Sarpanch
	Damodar Yadav Mahajan	
2007-12	Ujwala Bhangale	Shaikh Samsuddin Shaikh Kutubuddin
2012-15	Surekha Narendra Patil	Shaikh Kalim Shaikh Nyajuddin
2016-17		

17 gram panchayat members were elected in the December 2012 elections.

Panchayat samiti and Zilla parishad

Year	Gan	Panchayat Samiti Member	Party	Gat	Zill Parishad Member	Party
2007-12	Chinawal	Yogesh Janardhan Bhangale	INC	Chinawal-Khiroda	Tanuja Srikant Sarode	BJP
2012-17	Chinawal	Gopal Lakshman Nemade	BJP	Chinawal-Khiroda	Pushpa Prakash Tayade	INC

== Demographics ==
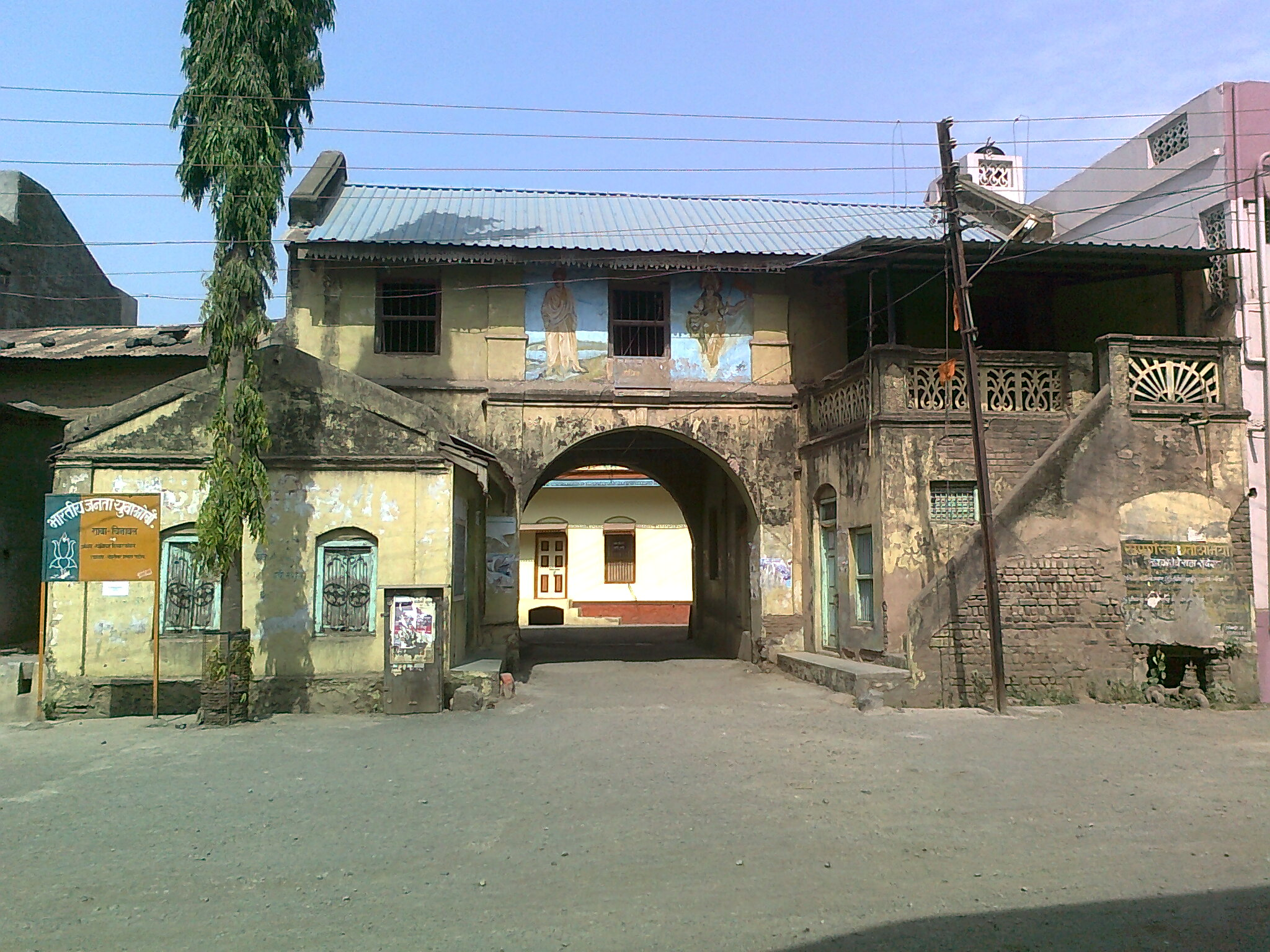
Chinawal's village gate

As per the 1951 Census of India, the population of the Chinawal village was 4720 with 977 households. The jurisdictional area of the village was spread over 5.3 sq. miles (13.73 km^{2}). The livelihood of 3866 villagers was agriculture-dependent.

From 1951 to 2011, the population of Chinawal increased by about 250%. As per the 2011 census of India, the population of the village is 11,747. The village has total of 2738 households with 6180 males and 5567 females, which corresponds to a sex ratio of 901 females for every 1000 males, which is lower than the national average sex ratio of 940. 1403 persons of the village were between age group 0–6 years, 751 boys and 652 girls.

Excluding these children which were yet to take admissions in the school, the average literacy rate of the village is 84.25%, which is above the national average literacy rate of 74.04%. In the village, 89.13% males are literate while 78.86% females are literate. Most villagers belong to a caste called Leva Patil.

1335 villagers are from scheduled castes, while 618 are from scheduled tribes. Out of 4,311 working villagers, 840 own cultivated land, 2347 work in agriculture, and 1124 villagers are involved in other work. 7,436 villagers are non-workers.

The area of the village is approx 1.05 square km and hence the density of the population is approx 11,000 per square km. Chinawal is the most populous village among 114 villages and towns of the Raver tehsil and there are only two towns in the Raver tehsil, Raver and Savda.

Sarpanch of the Chinawal village is Yogesh Borole.

=== Religion ===
The Ram Mandir in the Chinawal village was built in around 1863. Its property is the cause of dispute between Shri Ram Mandir Charitable Trust Chinawal and some villagers. A court case regarding this property dispute has been going on for many decades.

==== Gallery ====
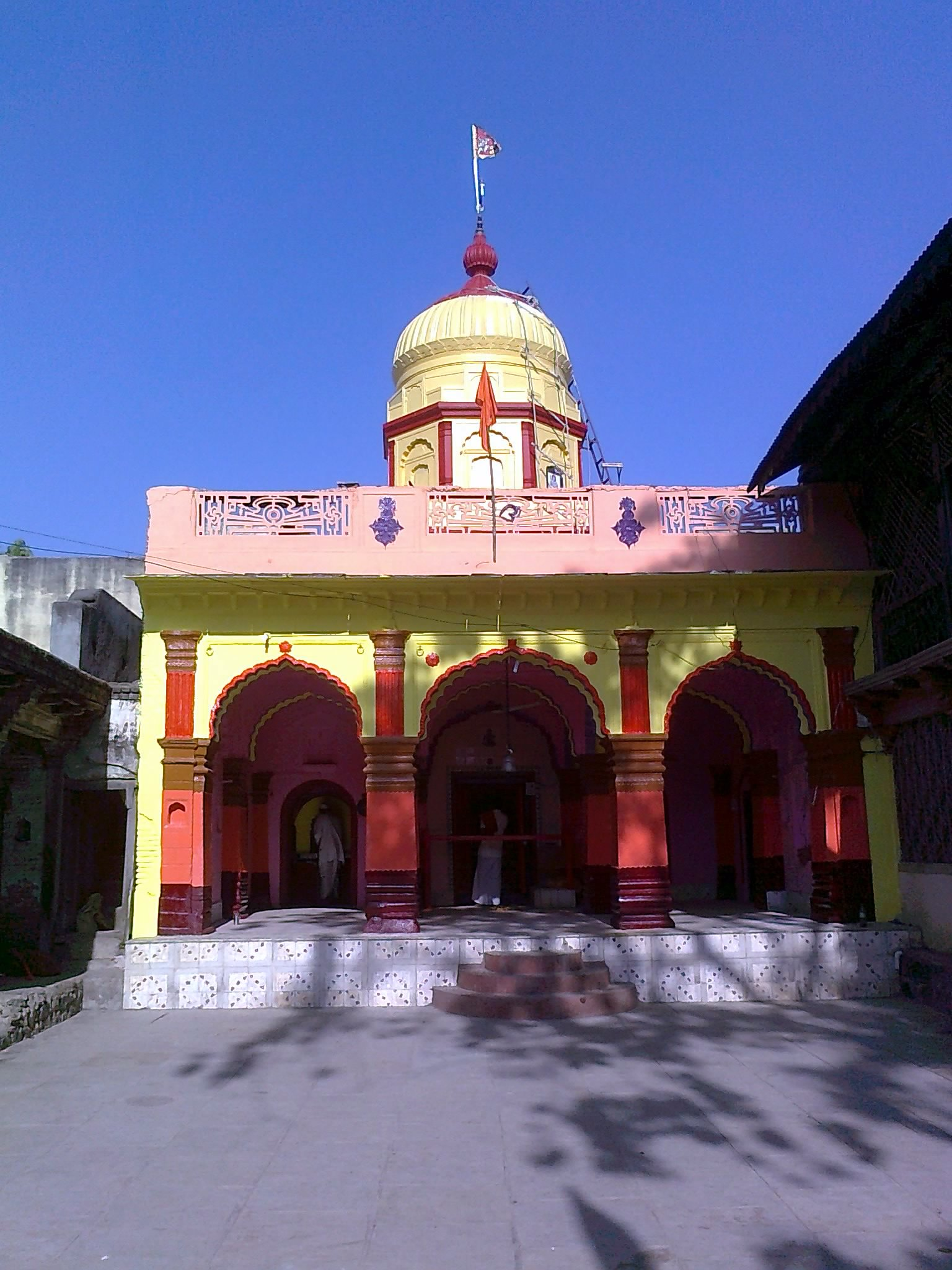
One of the oldest temples in Chinawal village, Ram Mandir

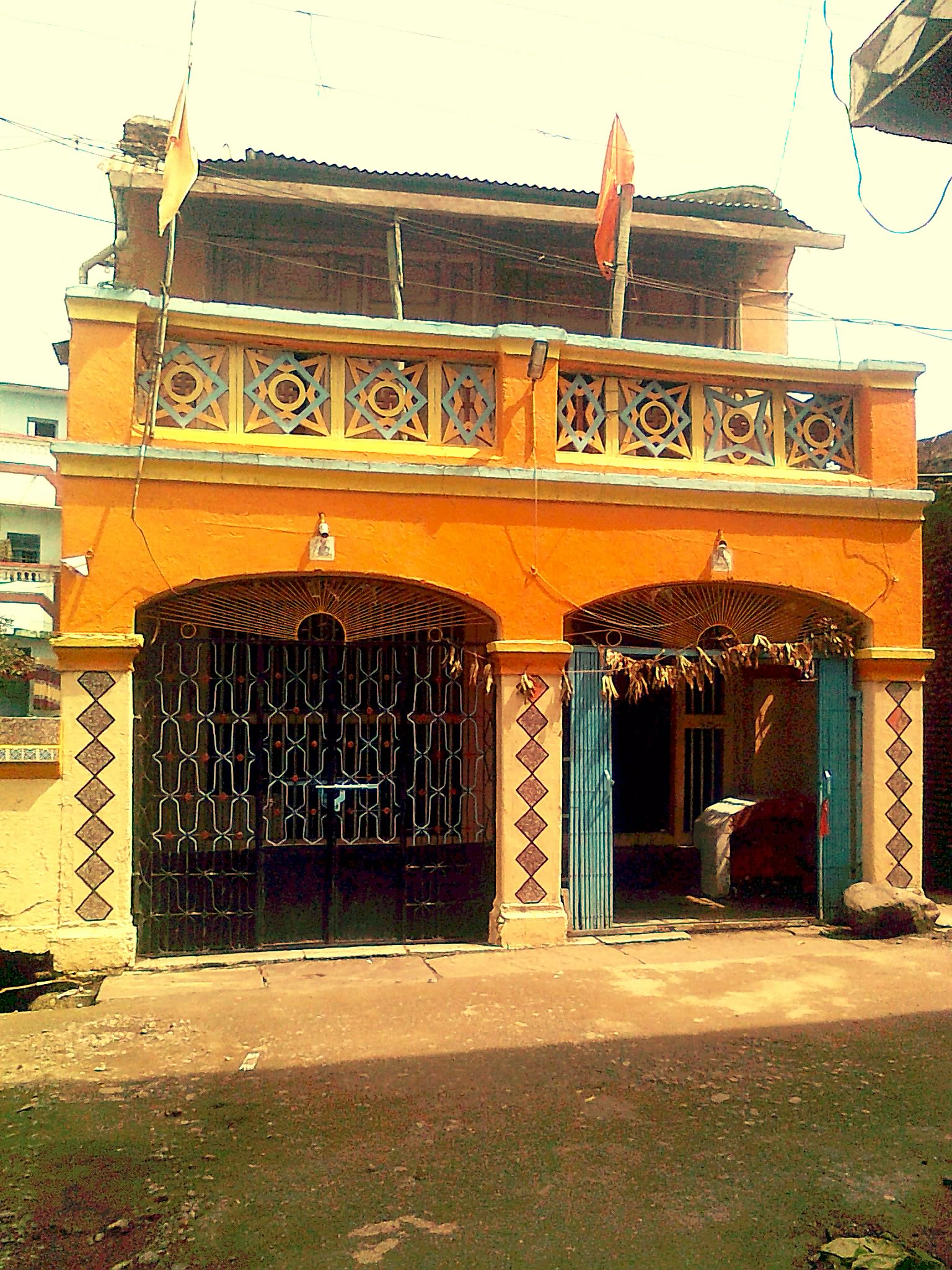
Another old temple, Maruti Mandir, in Chinawal village

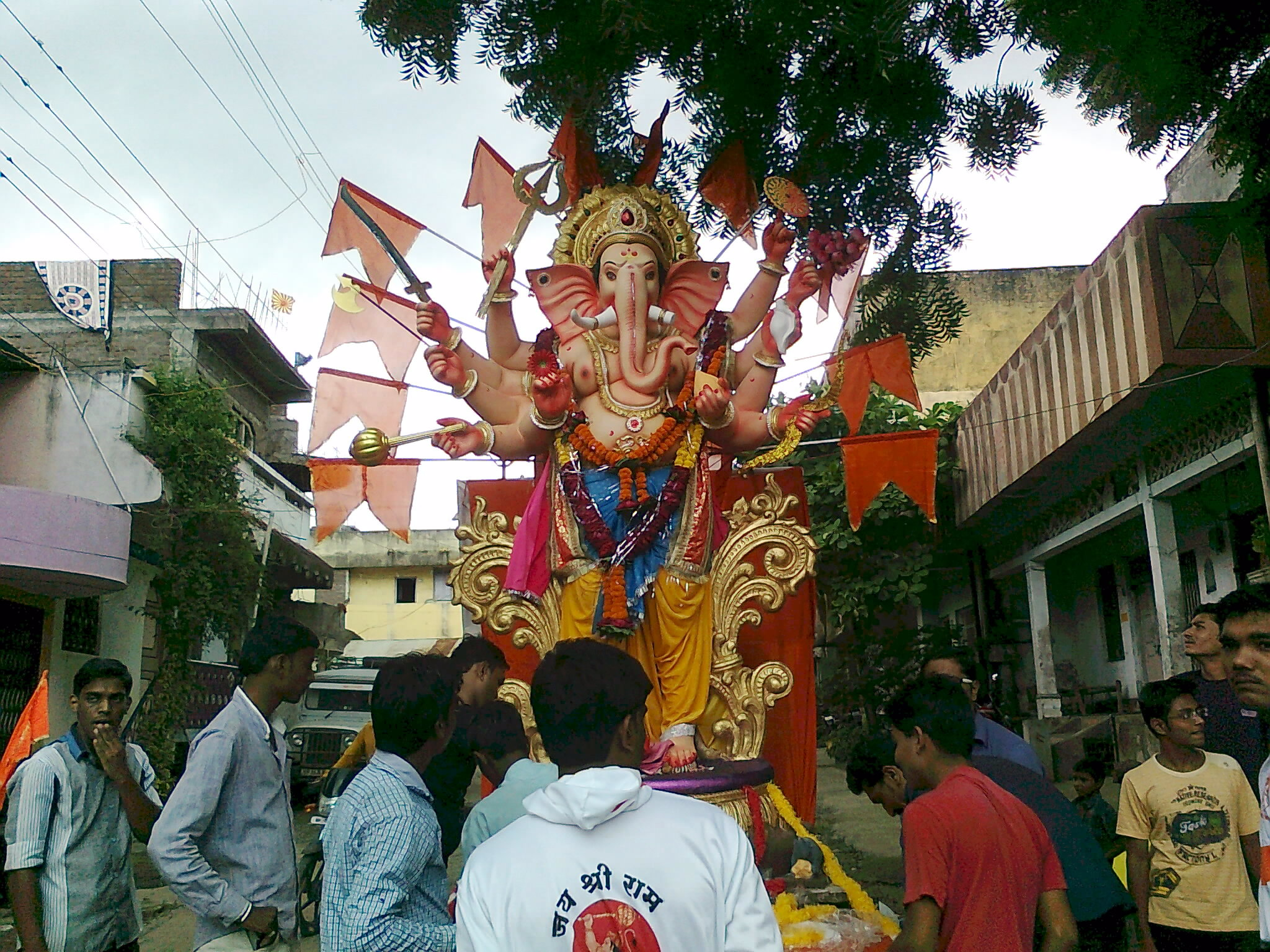
Ganesh Visarjan during Ganesh Chaturthi at Chinawal village in 2014

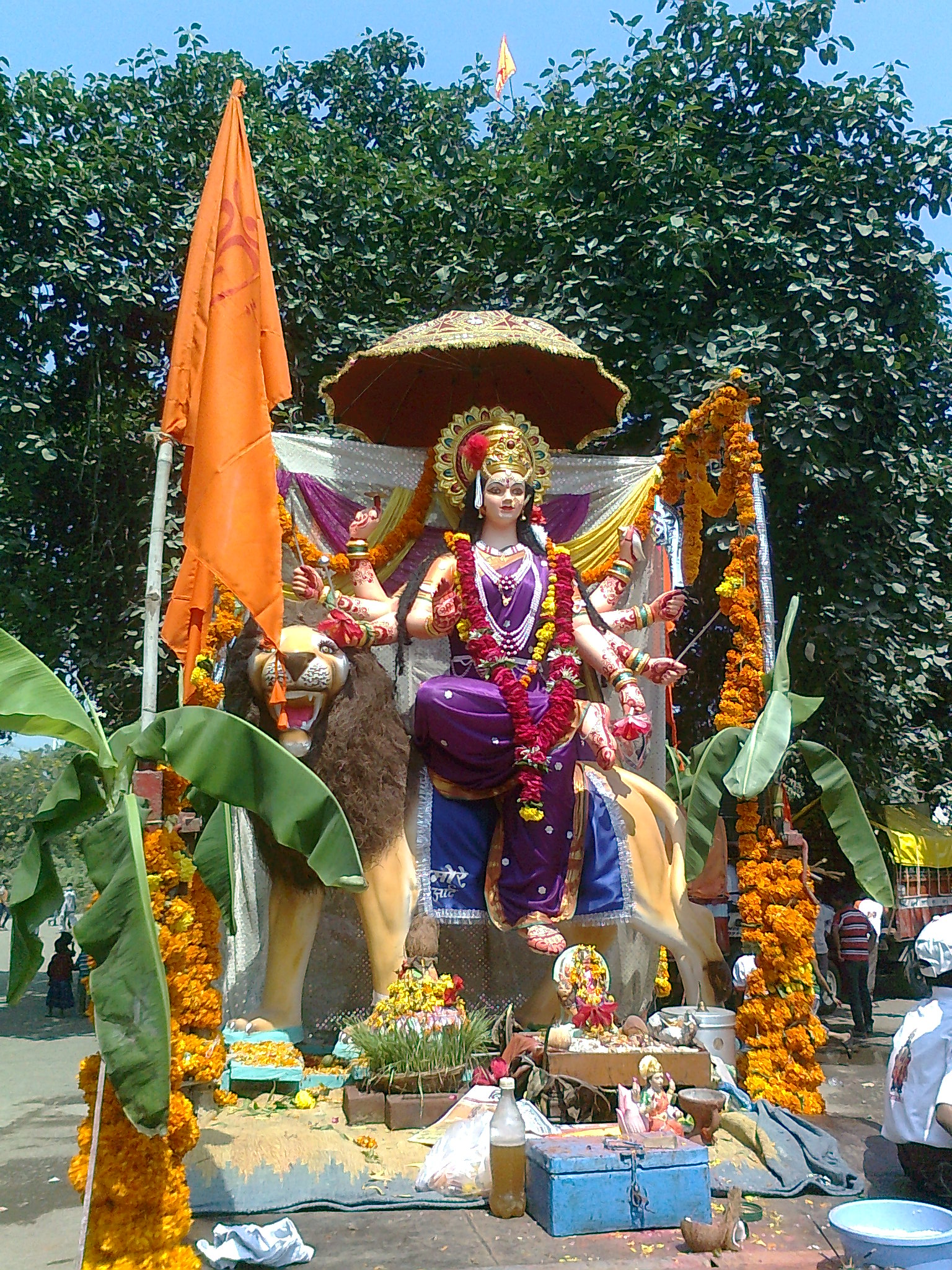
Durga Visarjan during Navaratri at Chinawal village in 2014

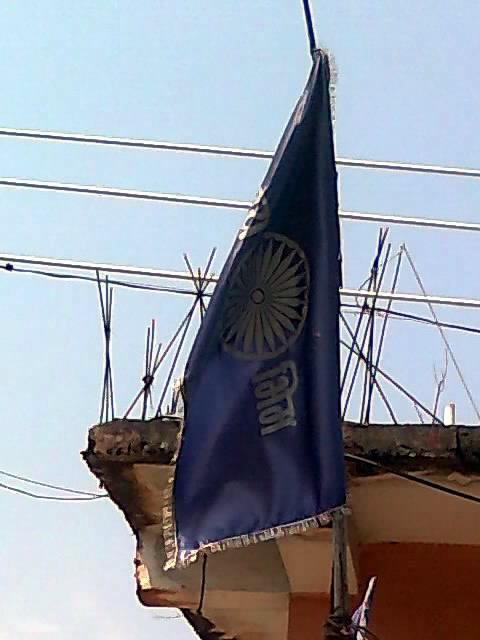
A blue flag at Chinawal with Dhamma wheel and Bhim word which represents the Dalit Buddhist movement

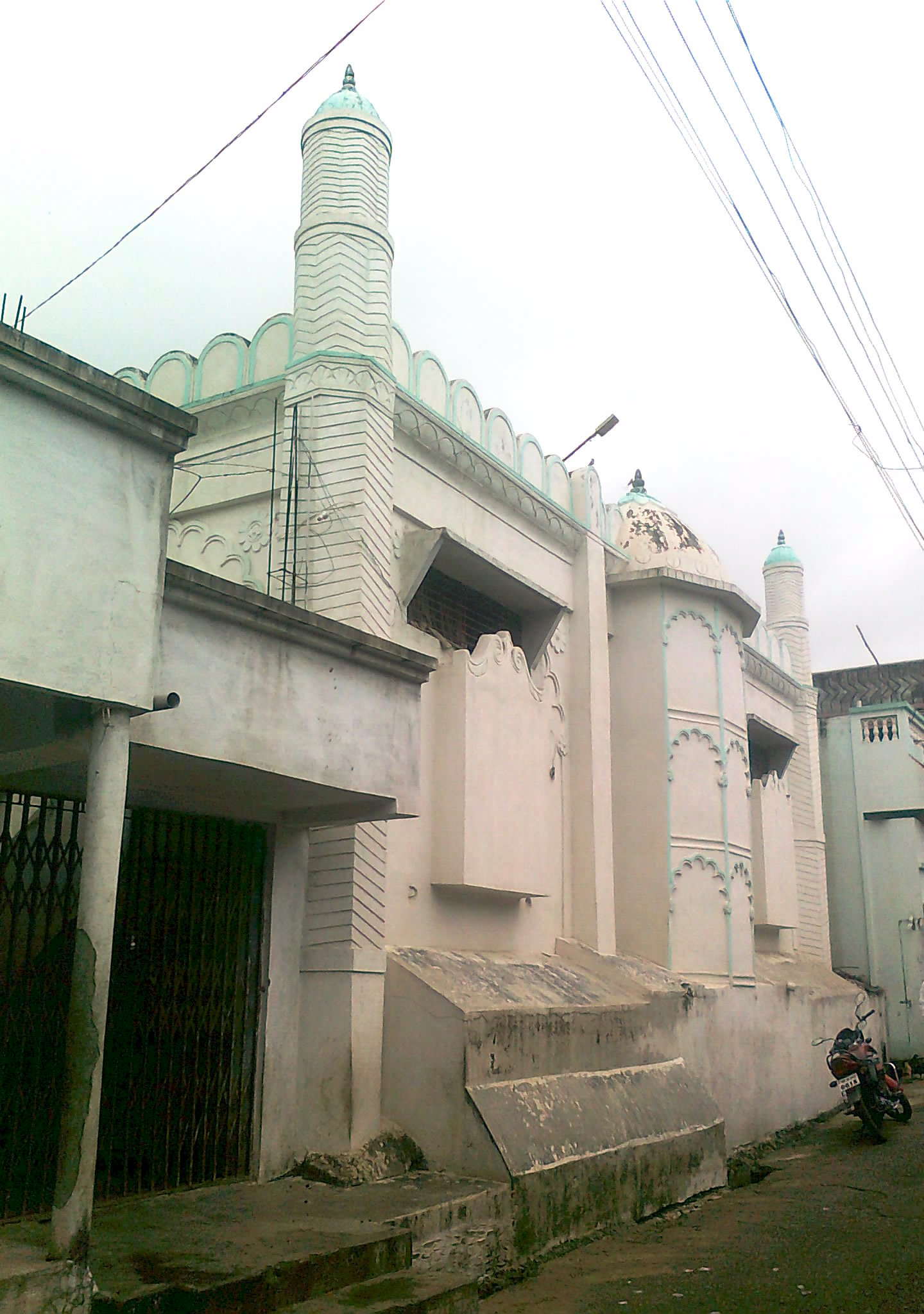
Muslim prayer place Masjid in Chinawal village

== Economy ==
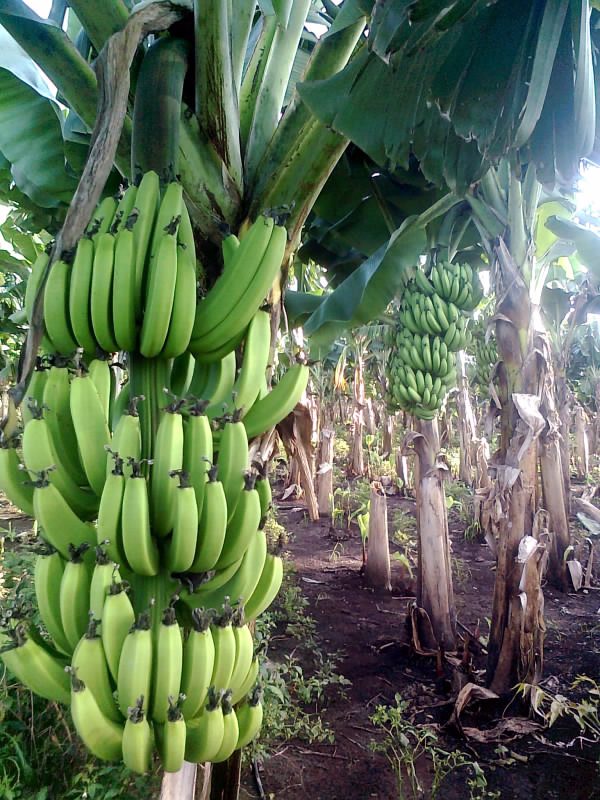
Banana farm in Chinawal

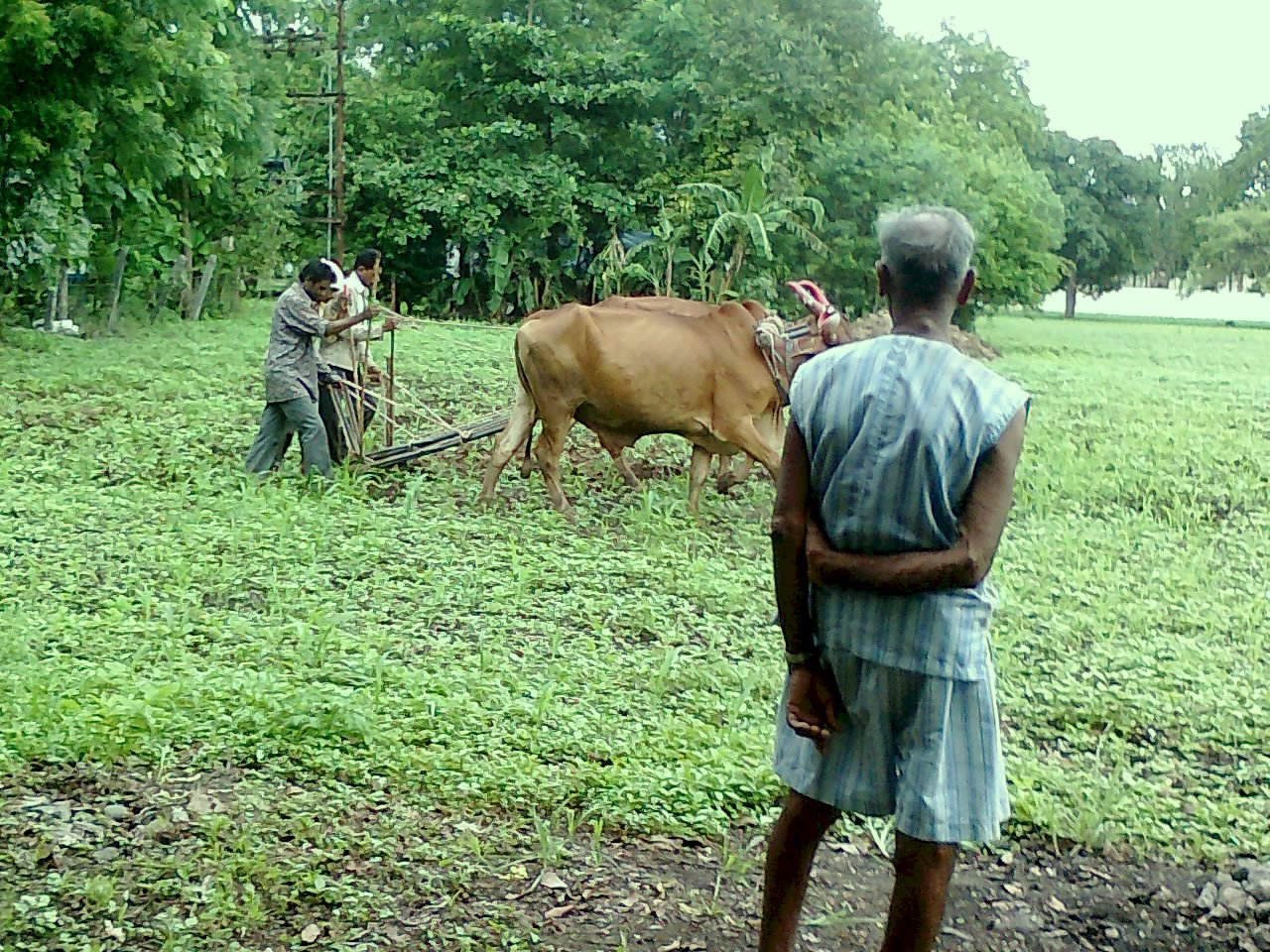
Farmers ploughing a field in Chinawal during monsoon season

The occupation of most villagers is agriculture. Out of 4311 working villagers, 3187 are involved in agriculture-related work and 1124 are involved in other work. More than 60% of the money circulation in the village depends upon agricultural produce.

Chinawal village and Jalgaon district are known for banana production, but this was not always the case. The 16th century Ain-i-Akbari written by Abul Fazl discusses the economy of the Khandesh region in detail, but does not mention banana cultivation It is not known with certainty when banana cultivation started in the Jalgaon district, but the Gazetteer of the Bombay Presidency (Vol II, Book IV, Part II, Page 176) written in 1880 made the following observation regarding banana cultivation in the Khandesh:

The Plantain, kel, Musa paradisiaca, is widely grown wherever water is plentiful and easily raised. There are two tolerably distinct kinds, the ray kel and the common kel. The ray kel is like the Chinese banana. The fruit, though thinner skinned and somewhat better flavoured than the common plantain, is less suitable for cooking, and being a light cropper and wanting much water, is but sparingly cultivated. The common three-cornered plantain, the taperi of Gujarat, the monde of Madras, and the gulur bale of Mysor, is easily grown and yields freely.

During the British period, Chinawal village was known for handloom weaving and quality cloth production, not for banana production. Page 229 of the British gazette made the following observation:

The chief hand-woven cloth goods are [...] floor cloths, cotton sheets, stamped dirty-red coverlets, smaller sheets and cushions, from Nandurbar, Shahada, Varsi, Betavad, Sindkheda, Chopda, Jalgaon, Jamner, Faizpur, and Chinaval.

The master weaver was used to supply yarn to handloom weavers in the Chinawal village and used to take ready clothes from the villagers to sell in weekly bazaars, shops, and fairs. The gazette made the following observation regarding the life of handloom weavers:

They are paid on an average from 3d. to 9d. (2–6 annas) a day. Both men and women weave, keeping not more than thirty holidays in the year, and working, except for about an hour's rest at noon, from morning to night, so long as they have light to see.

The gazette also noted that the textile machinery introduced by the Europeans in the Indian market had resulted in unequal competition and consequently villagers were losing their livelihood.

=== Banana ===
The main crops grown by the farmers are bananas and cotton, with priority given to the banana. Kharif crops are harvested during the monsoon season. Water for rabi crops comes from wells. In the decades running up to 1990, flood irrigation was extensively used, due to which the water level in the wells dropped to an alarming level. Because of awareness programmes run by the farmer Vasantrao Mahajan, social worker Digambar Narkheda and Jain Irrigation Systems, farmers have started using agronomic practices, soil testing, drip irrigation, and fertigation to conserve water and increase productivity. These modern methods of cultivation were noted by a team of agriculture officers from the government of Kerala who visited Chinawal village in June 2004. 99% of the banana cultivation in Chinawal village is under drip irrigation, which has increased per-plant yield from 15 kg to nearly 30 kg, averaging 65 tonnes per hectare.

Bananas are cultivated on 72,000 hectares of land in Maharashtra, out of which the city of Raver's contribution is 22,000 hectares. This heavy production of bananas, including that from Chinawal village, is exported to north India by trucks and railway. Raver Tehsil has three railway stations exclusively for loading bananas.

Not everything goes smoothly. Farmers suffer loss due to a volatile market, damage to crops due to intense heat and storms, non-irrigation of farms due to frequent load shedding, plant diseases like karpa, and the poor condition of roads in and around Chinawal village. In 2012, the government recognized bananas as 'fruit' and extended weather-based crop insurance to banana crops, which is now helping the farmers to bear the losses. But an uncertain market for bananas remains the concern. In 1992, due to the Ayodhya dispute, recession struck the industry very hard and farmers had to destroy their banana crops, while in May 2014 the market price of banana fluctuated between ₹625-₹1000 per quintal. Some farmers take loans from banks, co-operative societies, and friends for the cultivation of bananas, but often they cannot repay loans and are pushed into poverty. Despite these uncertainties, some better informed farmers like Vasantrao Mahajan and Dnyandeo Mahajan have successfully cultivated bananas for many decades.

=== Other ===
After the banana, priority is given to the cultivation of cotton, gahu and jwari. In pulses, first priority is given to harbhara, followed by udid daal toor daal, bhui mug and mung daal, while teel, maka, soybean, bajri are also favorite crops of the farmers. Cultivation of rice is non-existent in the Chinawal village. Some farmers have started growing turmeric and potatoes as alternative crops to the banana.

Satpura range is 10 km away from the Chinawal village, so water from the Suki dam cannot reach through canals to the farms in Chinawal village. As a solution, eight water wells alongside the bank of the Suki River are artificially recharged by releasing water in the bed of the river. Filling of these water wells leads to increase in the water level of 600 water wells in Chinawal and other surrounding villages. This water is used for irrigating the farms.

All farmers of the Chinawal village cannot afford to buy modern agricultural machinery. Only a handful of farmers own tractors and threshers, which are rented to the other farmers. Tractos are used for the initial laborious work of tilling the hardened soil. Then later on, an ox-driven plough, is used for sowing and weed control.

Farmers keep part of their produce for their own consumption, some may be sold to other villagers, and then the surplus produce is sold in the Raver and Savda markets, both of which are less than 20 km away from the Chinawal village.

Other needs of the villagers like spices, oil, salt, stationery, and medicine are provided by the retail shopkeepers who buy these articles in wholesale from the neighbouring towns and sell it to the villagers. A bazaar is periodically held in Chinawal where small traders sell various commodities at negotiable rates. 973 villagers are involved in non-agriculture work to offer what farmers cannot produce. Their occupation includes domesticating dairy cattle like buffalos and cows for dairy products, retail stores, service and repairs, healthcare, hotels, tobacco selling etc. There are some very poor villagers who work as the agricultural labourers and they get work only during particular seasons. The government supports them with the food scheme Antyodaya Anna Yojana.

== Education ==
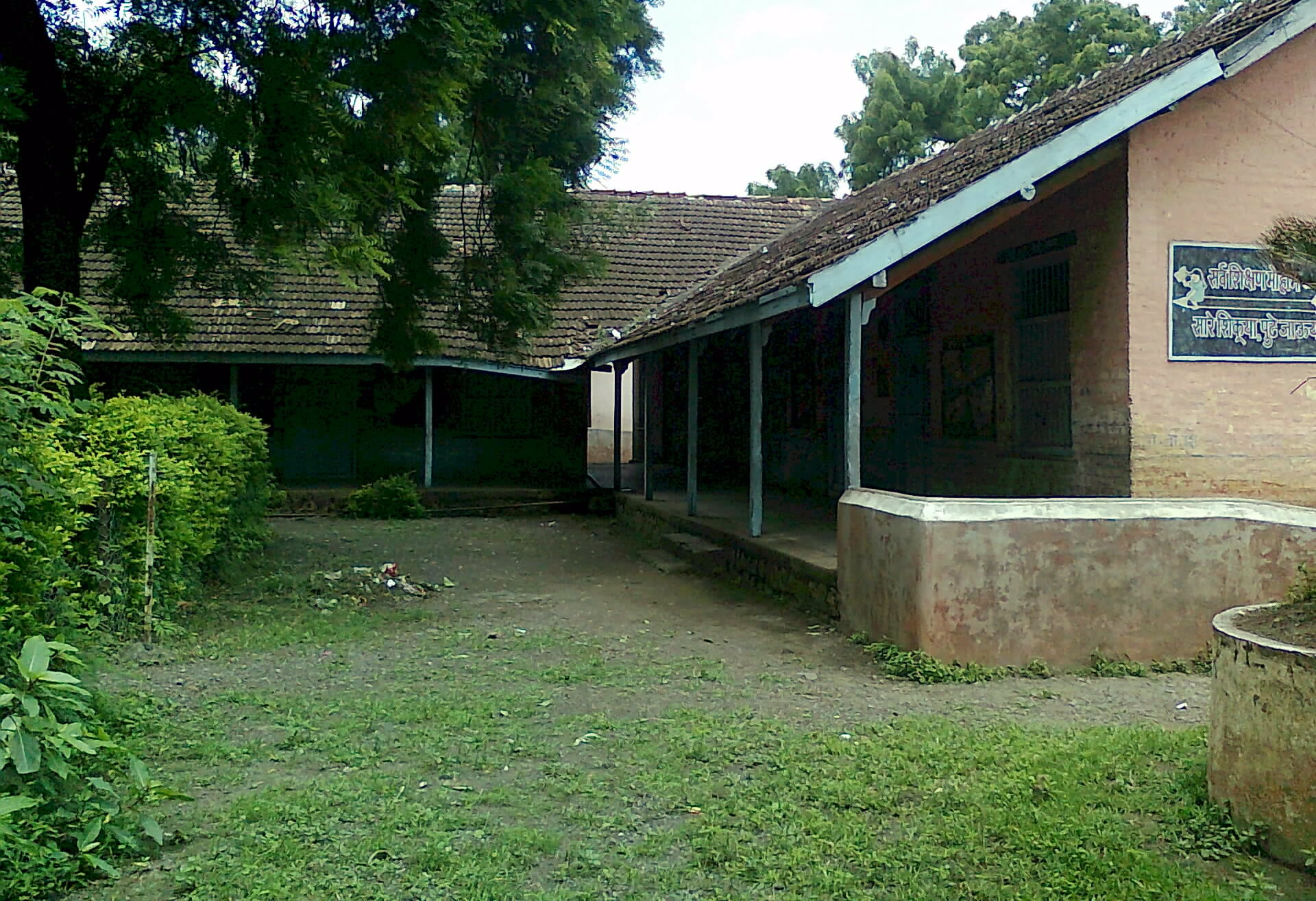
Zila Parishad Boys' Primary School (est. 18 March 1865)

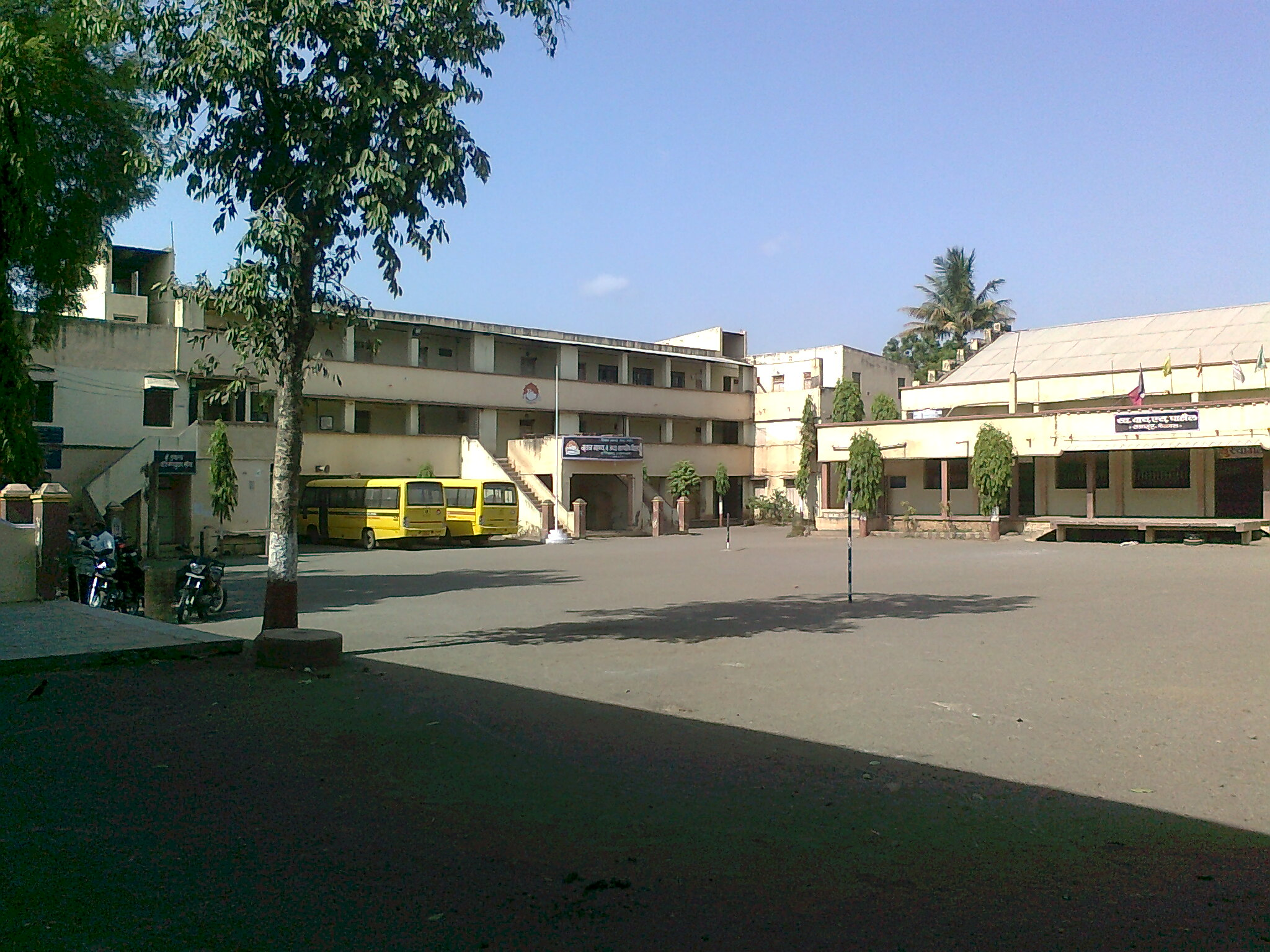
Main building of Nutan Madhyamik Vidyalaya

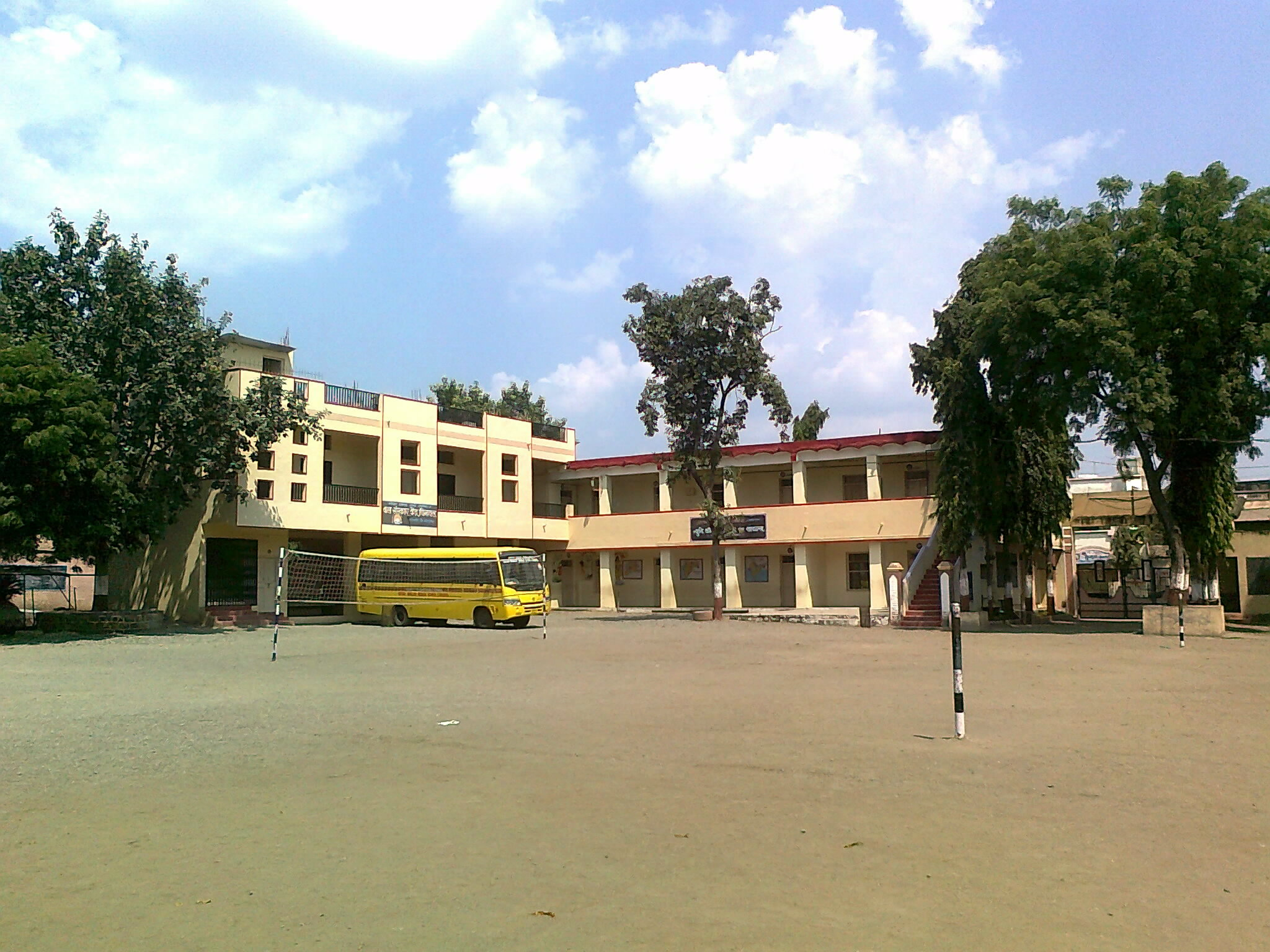
Nutan Uchch Madhyamik Vidyalaya and Baal Sanskaar Kendra

Schools in the village follow the 10+2+3 education pattern of Maharashtra. 1st to 5th standard education is called primary level education, 6th to 8th standard education is called upper primary level, and 9th to 10th standard education is called high school level. Schools conduct their own examinations up to 9th standard and in 11th standard, but at the end of 10th standard and 12th standard, the state level public examinations SSC and HSC are conducted. After getting their SSC or HSC certificate, students may opt to find jobs. For those who wish to continue their education after HSC, there are various options. They may continue their college level education for another 3 years (under the 10+2+3 pattern) to get degrees like B.Sc., B.Com., or B.A., or they may opt for other degree courses like B.E. or MBBS.

As per the Right of Children to Free and Compulsory Education Act passed in 2009, all children from 6–14 years are provided with free education. All the direct and indirect expenses of students, like textbooks, uniforms, and transportation are borne by the government. Two trained teachers are mandatory per 60 students. As per government rules, every school has 145 days of vacation in a year.

There are two primary schools in the Chinawal village for elementary education up to 4th standard in Marathi language medium: Zila Parishad boys' school and Zila Parishad girls' school. Primary education through English language medium is provided by the Nutan Prathamik Vidya Mandir school. Education from 5th standard up to 12th standard, HSC is provided by the Nutan Madhyamik Vidyalaya. Shikshan Prasarak Mandal has its own school buses to transport students from the nearby villages to the school. Hostel accommodation is provided to the students who comes from nearby small villages. A privately aided Urdu medium school - Khizar Urdu High School - was established in 1997 and is affiliated to MSBSHSE.

SSC and HSC exams are conducted at the Nutan Madhyamik Vidyalaya, where students studying at other schools in the nearby villages also come to give their exams. In the 2012 SSC result of Nutan Madhyamik Vidyalaya, 90% or 153 out of 170 students had cleared the SSC exam. In 2013, this percentage went up to 98.96% (190/192). In the 2014 SSC results, Nutan Madhyamik Vidyalaya maintained this record with a 99.49% (196/197) result. In 2015, this percentage stood at 99.53% (212/213). The passing out percentage of the Khijar Urdu High School in SSC exam was 36/57 or 63.16% in 2012, 45/53 or 84.91% in 2013, 43/45 or 95.56% in 2014 and 44/47 or 93.62% in 2015. In 2013, 206 out of 244 or 84.43% students who appeared for the HSC exam at Nutan Madhyamik Vidyalaya, had cleared the HSC exam, and in 2014, this percentage stood at 95.83 with 184 out of 192 students passing out. In 2015, this percentage stood at 95.90% with 257 out of 268 students passing out in HSC exam.

Shikshan Prasarak Mandal has recently started an industrial training institute at Chinawal. Work on the proposed D.Ed. college is in progress. Except Zila Parishad primary schools and Khijar Urdu High School, all educational facilities at Chinawal are run by the Shikshan Prasarak Mandal, Chinawal. The nearest college for graduation and post-graduation courses is Dhanaji Nana College at Faizpur which is 7 km away.

== Violence ==
On 11 April 2011 at around 9 am, masked robbers with handguns robbed the Central Bank of India in Chinawal. In a struggle, they stabbed a bank employee and then shot him. They stole around one million rupees from the safe of the bank and escaped on motorcycles. The bank employee survived the gunshot, but the robbers were never caught.

In June 2010, a poster of Babasaheb Ambedkar was torn and in a subsequent riot, four police constables and two villagers were injured.

In September 2002, a minor riot broke out between the two communities of the village during the Ganesh visarjan procession, but no serious injuries or death were reported.

In March 2011, farmers sighted a tiger in the farms of Chinawal, causing panic among the farmers. Forest officers tried to track the tiger by his pug-marks and GPS, but could not locate him.
