= Pavuluri =

Family name from Andhra Pradesh, India

Pavuluri (Telugu: పావులూరి) is a Telugu toponymic surname from Pavuluru, Andhra Pradesh, India.

== Notable people ==
- Pavuluri Mallana, an Indian mathematician of the 11th or early 12th century CE from present day Andhra Pradesh
