= AMTI =

AMTI or Amti may refer to:

- Association of Mathematics Teachers of India
- Airborne moving target indication
- Apostolic Missionary Training Institute
- Amti, a village in Boliney, Abra, the Philippines
