= Ramdas L. Bhirud =

Indian mathematician (1937–1997)

Ramdas L. Bhirud (Ramdas Lotu Bhirud or R. L. Bhirud) (7 April 1937 – 4 January 1997), was an Indian mathematician from Maharashtra region of India worked in the field of numerical analysis, special functions and number theory.

== Early life and education ==
Ramdas was born on 7 April 1937, in Chinawal, Maharashtra, India. He was one of six children. He did his elementary school education in Chinawal. After that moved to Mumbai for middle school and high school education. He attended Elphinstone College in Mumbai for his bachelor's degree in mathematics.

== Career ==
After his bachelor's degree from University of Mumbai Ramdas set out for his master's degree and PhD from University of Michigan in United States. For his PhD he contributed to the theory and construction of the Padé table. After his studies for a brief period he worked as an Assistant Professor at Purdue University in Indianapolis before returning to India where he worked as a professor of mathematics at MPKV Rahuri.
