= National Mathematics Talent Contest =

India's national-level mathematics contest conducted by the (AMTI)

The National Mathematics Talent Contest or NMTC is a national-level mathematics contest conducted by the Association of Mathematics Teachers of India (AMTI). It is strongest in Tamil Nadu, which is the operating base of the AMTI. The AMTI is a pioneer organisation in promoting, and conducting, Maths Talent Tests in India. In the National level tests, over 125,000 students from 332 institutions spread all over India, participated at the screening level. Of these, 10% were selected for the final test. For the benefit of final level contestants, and the chosen few for INMO, special orientation camps were conducted. Merit certificates and prizes were awarded to the deserving students.

Thirty-five among them from Tamil Nadu and Puducherry at the Junior and Inter Levels have been sponsored to write the Indian National Mathematics Olympiad (INMO 2013). From among them 2 have been selected at the national level.

== Levels ==
- Primary level: Standard 5 and 6, is called the Gauss Contest
- Sub-junior level: Standards 7 and 8, is called the Kaprekar Contest
- Junior level: Standards 9 and 10, is called the Bhaskara Contest
- Inter level: Standards 11 and 12, is called the Ramanujan Contest
- Senior level: B.Sc. students, is called the Aryabhata Contest

== Stages ==
For all levels except the Senior level, there is a preliminary examination comprising multiple choice questions. The preliminary examination is held in the end of August. Students qualifying in the preliminary examination are eligible to sit for the main examination, which is held around the last week of October. A week before the main examination, students are invited for a two-day orientation camp.

== Fee ==
The fee for the preliminary examination is Rs. 150 in India. No further fee is required for the main examination. Rs. 150/- per candidate (out of which Rs.25/- will be retained by the institution only for all expenses and Rs.125/- to be sent to AMTI).

== Syllabus ==
No special knowledge of curriculum material is required. Good knowledge of curriculum at the next lower level would be helpful. The syllabus for Mathematics Olympiad (Regional, National and International) is pre-degree college mathematics. The areas covered are, mainly –

a) Algebra, b) Geometry, c) Number theory and d) Graph theory & combinatorics.

Algebra: Polynomials, Solving equations, inequalities, and complex numbers.

Geometry: Geometry of triangles and circles.

(Trigonometric methods, vector methods, complex number methods, transformation geometry methods can also be used to solve problems)

Number Theory: Divisibility, Diophantine equations, congruence relations, prime numbers and elementary results on prime numbers.

Combinatorics & Graph Theory: Counting techniques, pigeon hole principle, the principle of inclusion and exclusion, basic graph theory.
