= Garbaldi Dam =

- Location within Maharashtra
- Official name: Suki Dam D01350
- Location: Khiroda
- Coordinates: 21.307212°N 75.898014°E
- Opening date: 1977
- Owners: Government of Maharashtra, India

Dam and spillways
- Type of dam: Earthfill
- Impounds: Suki river
- Height: 42 m (138 ft)
- Length: 716 m (2,349 ft)
- Dam volume: 1,430 km^{3} (340 cu mi)

Reservoir
- Total capacity: 39,860 km^{3} (9,560 cu mi)
- Surface area: 366 km^{2} (141 sq mi)

Garbaldi Dam, is an earthfill dam on Suki river near Khiroda, Jalgaon district in the state of Maharashtra in India.

== Specifications ==
The height of the dam above lowest foundation is 42 m (138 ft) while the length is 716 m (2,349 ft). The volume content is 1,430 km^{3} (340 cu mi) and gross storage capacity is 50,170.00 km^{3} (12,036.42 cu mi).

== Purpose ==
- Irrigation

== See also ==
- Dams in Maharashtra
- List of reservoirs and dams in India
