= Khiroda =

Village in Maharashtra

- village
- Location in Maharashtra, India Khiroda (India)
- Coordinates: 21.2070036°N 75.883086°E
- Country: India
- State: Maharashtra
- District: Jalgaon

Population
  - Total: 7,000

Languages
  - Official: Marathi
- Time zone: UTC+5:30 (IST)
- PIN: 425 504
- Nearest city: Savda, Faizpur

Khiroda is a village in Jalgaon district in the state of Maharashtra in India, located in the Satpuda Hills 7 km north of Savda on the Burhanpur - Ankaleshwar Road. Khiroda has a population of 7,000.

== Economy ==
Agriculture, especially banana cultivation, is the primary source of employment in the village. Fine artists also reside in the area.

== Education ==
Khiroda has an education college, a fine arts college, and other graduating colleges and schools.

== Notable people ==
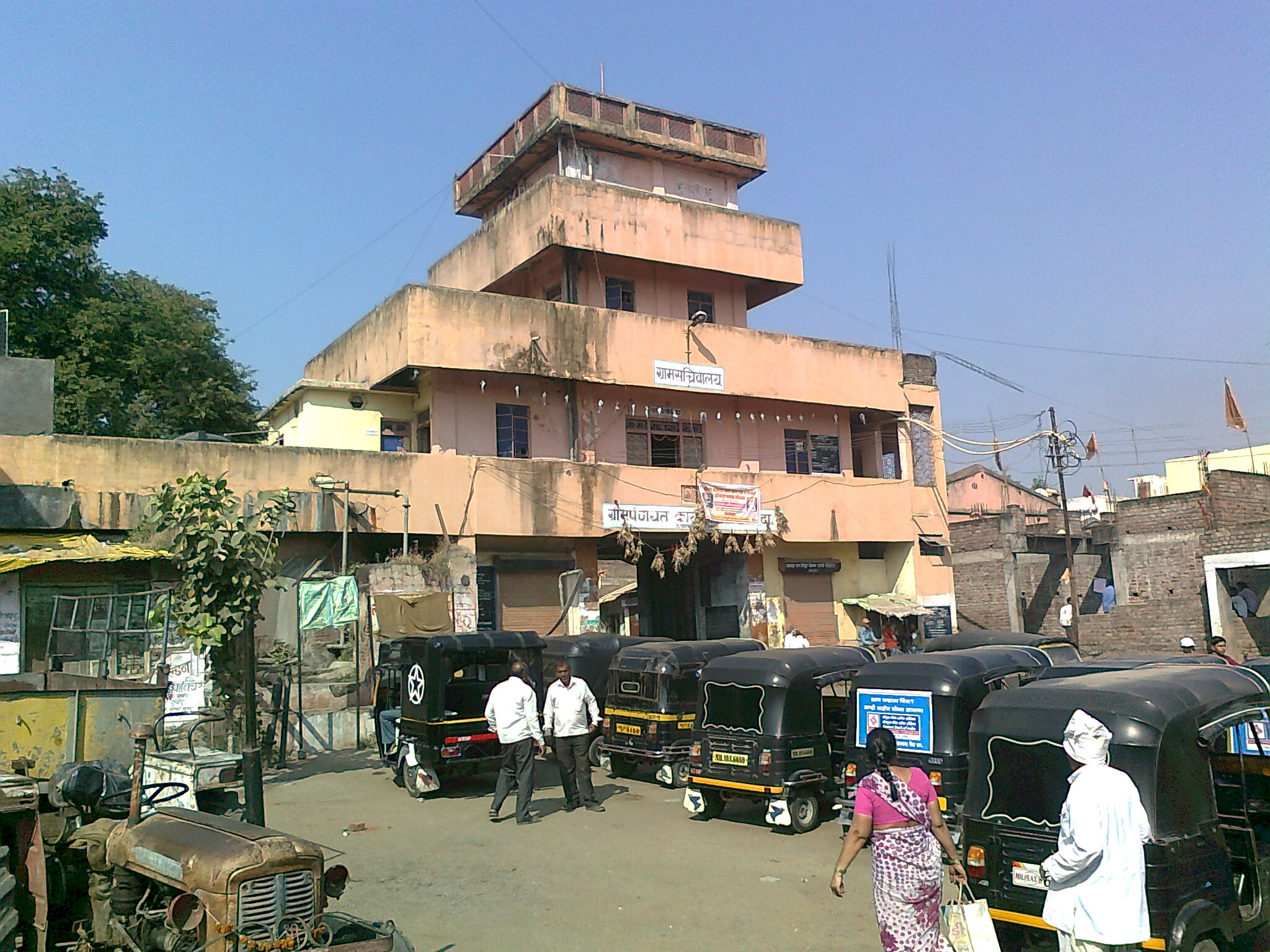
Gram panchayat office and rikshaw stand at Khiroda

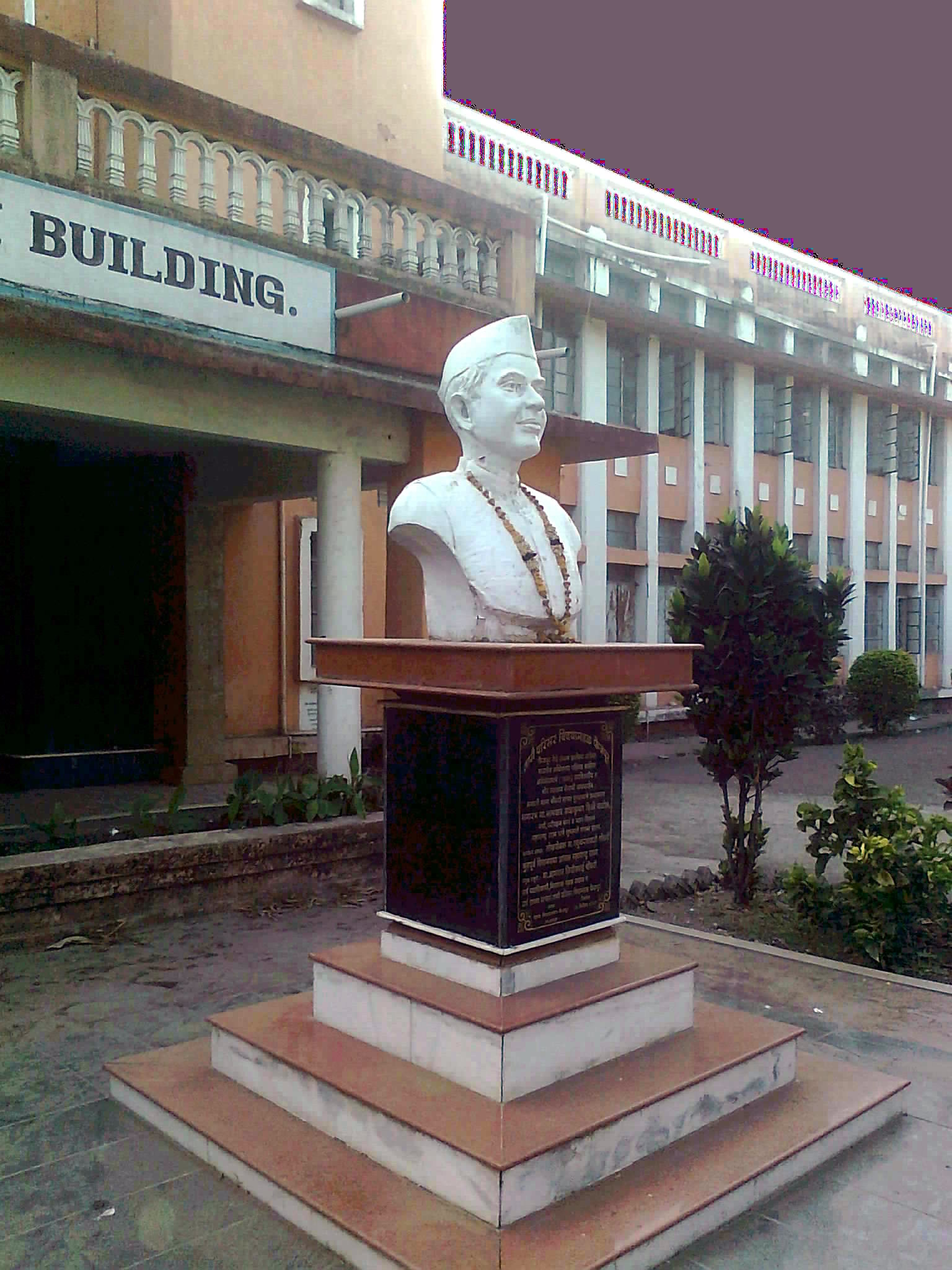
Statue of Madhukarrao Chaudhari in D N College, Faizpur

Khiroda has been origin of many Gandhian followers and freedom fighters. The village is birthplace of Madhukarrao Chaudhari (popularly known as Balasaheb), former legislative assembly head and Maharashtra State minister for Finance, Education, Revenue, and Forestry. One of the great adherent was late Mr. Bhausaheb alias Danji Maharu Bonde (MLA during 1952-57). He was felicitated as "FIRST Dalitmitra" accolade by Government of Maharashtra state (India). His son late Mr.Sunit Dhanji Bonde was awarded with "Jamnalal Bajaj Award" in 1987 by then prime minister Rajeev Gandhi for devoting his entire life in the service of Adivasi people in Satpuda ranges. His younger brother Mr. Manohar Maharu Chaudhari is also freedom fighter, famous sculpturist and fine artist and has been a founder of Saptput Lalitkala Bhavan (Fine Art College) founded in 1965 and has worked as the Principal for twenty years. He is one of the great poets and only perspicacious people have been able to understand the profundity of his poems. Freedom fighter Lalu Jayaram Phalak; and senior freedom fighter Dhanaji Nana Chaudhari, the latter was instrumental in arranging the first rural congress during the year 1936, which was held at Faizpur. It brought the nation's topmost leaders like Mahatma Gandhi, Javahar Lal Neharu, Vinoba Bhave, Sane Guruji, Khan Abdul Gaffar Khan popularly known as "SARHAD GANDHI" and Vallabhbhai Patel (Iron Man of India) to the village.
