= Pavuluri Mallana =

11th-12th century Indian mathematician

- పావులూరి మల్లన
- Born: Eastern Chalukya Kingdom (modern-day East Godavari district, Andhra Pradesh, India)
- Years active: c. 11th or early 12th century CE

Academic background
- Influences: Mahaviracharya

Academic work
- Main interests: Mathematics
- Notable works: Sāra Sangraha Ganitamu

Pavuluri Mallana was a c. 11th or early 12th century Indian mathematician from present-day Andhra Pradesh. He translated Gaṇita-sāra-saṅgraha, a 9th century Sanskrit mathematical treatise of Mahaviracharya into Telugu as Sāra Sangraha Ganitamu, popularly known as Pavuluri Ganitamu.

Sāra Sangraha Ganitamu was the earliest translation of a mathematical text from Sanskrit into a regional language and also the oldest scientific text written in Telugu. It is also the first scientific treatise on mathematics in any Dravidian language. Mallana also described the system of weights, measures, and coinage used in Andhra in that era in his work. Mallana's work was followed by Eluganti Peddana's Prakīrna Ganitamu, a Telugu translation of Bhāskara's Līlāvatī.

== Life ==
Pavuluri Mallana was a c. 11th or early 12th century Indian mathematician from present-day Andhra Pradesh. Some historians consider him to be a contemporary of the Eastern Chalukyan king Rajaraja Narendra (r. 1022–1061 CE), while others place him in early 12th century CE. Mallana was a Saivite. His grandson, also named Mallana, was a famous writer. However, some historians consider Pavuluri Mallana, the mathematician to be the grandson of Mallana, the poet. Rajaraja Narendra donated Nava Khandavada village near Pitapuram to Mallana, but it is not clear to which Mallana the grant refers to.

== Work ==
Mallana translated Gaṇita-sāra-saṅgraha, a 9th century Sanskrit mathematical treatise of Mahaviracharya into Telugu as Sāra Sangraha Ganitamu, popularly known as Pavuluri Ganitamu. It was the earliest translation of a mathematical text from Sanskrit into a regional language and also oldest scientific text written in Telugu. It has been noted that Mallana being a Saivite replaced all Jain references in Gaṇita-sāra-saṅgraha with Saivite terminology. Mallana also described the system of weights, measures, and coinage used in Andhra in that era in his work.

While Mahavira's work was said to be in eight adhikaras or topics, Mallana adapted it into ten topics in his Sāra Sangraha Ganitamu. The first topic has been popular as Pavuluri Ganitamu. The other chapters are (in chronological order): Bhagahara Ganitamu, Suvarga Ganitamu, Misra Ganitamu, Bhinna Ganitamu, Kshetra Ganitamu, Khāta Ganitamu, Chāya Ganitamu, Sutra Ganitamu, and Prakirna Ganitamu. George Gheverghese Joseph notes that Mallana's translation served as a model for future translations because of its clarity and innovation. Sreeramula Rajeswara Sarma writes of him as:

Mallana was a superb translator. The lucidity with which he rendered the terse Sanskrit of Mahāvīra is worth emulating by every modern translator of scientific texts. His way of handling mathematical rules or examples containing large numbers - some examples have as many as 36 digits - is unrivaled even in Sanskrit. He abridged the material of the Sanskrit original at certain places and expanded at others. Thus while Gaṇitasārasan̄graha contains five methods of squaring and seven of cubing, the Telugu version has only one each and avoids all algebraic methods. Mallana also employs units of measure that were prevalent in the Andhra region of his time. Another innovation or addition in Telugu version pertains to mathematics proper. There are 45 additional examples under multiplication and 21 under division, which are not found in Sanskrit. All these examples have one common feature: to produce numbers containing a symmetric arrangement of digits.

== See also ==
- List of Indian mathematicians
