= Vasantrao Mahajan =

Indian farmer

- Born: 1930 or 1931 (age 94–95); Chinawal, India
- Occupation: Farmer
- Known for: Contribution to Banana cultivation

Vasantrao Laxman Mahajan (born c. 1942) is a farmer from Chinawal village of Maharashtra state of India. He is known for his contribution to revolutionise banana crop production in the Jalgaon district, which has highest productivity of banana in the world.

== Personal life ==
Vasantrao Mahajan was born into Chinawal village of Maharashtra state of India 1942. He has degree of M.Sc in Agriculture. He owns 10 acre land in Chinawal village. He has three sons- Virendra Mahajan, Ajay Mahajan, Yogesh Mahajan. He lives at his hometown Chinawal with his family. His son Yogesh is also a farmer who has received 'Nalla Vazhai' award from National Research Centre for Banana.

== Career ==
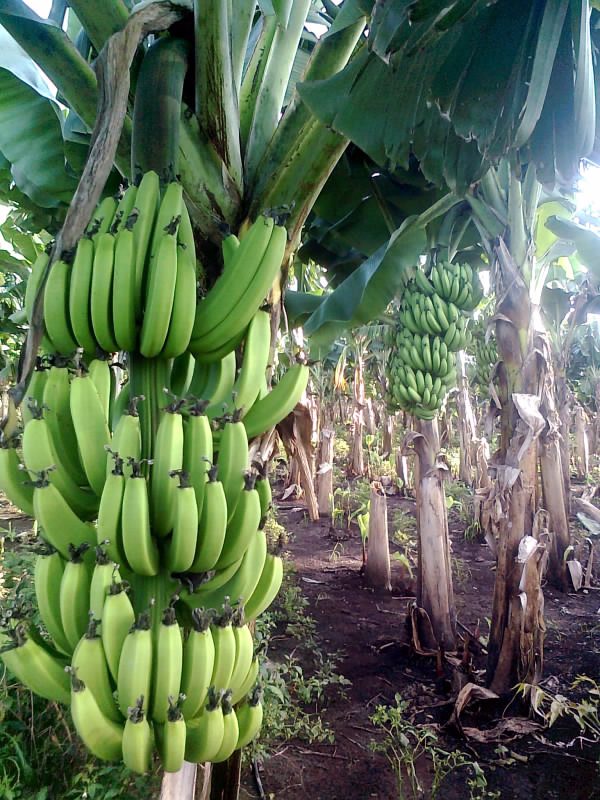
banana farm in Chinawal village

After receiving post-graduation degree, instead of going for employment, Mahajan chose to do farming in his Chinawal village. Banana cultivation in Jalgaon district started around 1925. Initially traditional farming methods like flood irrigation, sucker planting etc. were being used to grow banana crops. Water level in wells had dropped from 25 feet to 250 feet which had created scarcity of water for farming.

Mahajan successfully used modern methods of agriculture in his farms to conserve water and increase production of banana. Mahajan uses Grand Nain and shrimanti varieties of banana to grow in his farm. After his successful experimentation, he arranged thousands of farmer meetings all over Jalgaon district to spread awareness about high-tech methods of banana cultivation. He advocated agronomic practices like soil testing, planting tissue culture plants, drip irrigation to conserve water, fertigation which resulted in control of weeds, lower labour cost and increase in per plant yield of banana bunch from 15 kg to nearly 30 kg.

In June 2004, a team of agriculture officers from Kerala visited Chinawal during their study tour of Jalgaon district and met Mahajan. In their report to Government of Kerala, the team has described Mahajan's contribution to banana cultivation as "quite amazing".

== Honours ==
In 2003, Government of Maharashtra honoured Mahajan with Jijamata Krishi Bhushan award. He has held positions of Honorary Secretary of Banana Growers Association of India and Director of Agricultural produce marketing committee, Raver. In 2000, he received 'Banana Life-Time Achievement Award' from Jain Irrigation Systems. In 2004, he became Management Council Member of National Banana Research Centre, Tiruchirappalli. In 2006, he was selected as member of Extended Education Council Committee in Mahatma Phule Agriculture University, Rahuri. In 2011, he was elected as Chairman of Krishi Utpann Baajaar Samiti (Agriculture Produce Marketing Committee), Raver.
