= P. K. Srinivasan =

Indian mathematician (1924-2005)

P.K. Srinivasan (PKS) (4 November 1924 – 20 June 2005) was a well known mathematics teacher in Chennai, India. He taught mathematics at the Muthialpet High School in Chennai, India until his retirement. His singular dedication to education of mathematics would bring him to the United States, where he worked for a year, and then to Nigeria, where he would work for six years. He is known in India for his dedication to teaching mathematics and in creating pioneering awareness of the Indian mathematician Ramanujan. He has authored several books in English, Telugu and Tamil that introduce mathematics to children in novel and interesting ways. He was also a prominent reviewer of math books in the weekly Book Review column of the Indian newspaper The Hindu in Chennai.

== Experience ==
PKS, as he was known to the world-at-large, among his colleagues, students and friends, travelled to the United States as a Fulbright exchange teacher and worked in Liverpool Central School, New York, in 1965-'66. Later he served as a Senior education officer and a Senior lecturer in mathematics in Nigeria for six years. He served as a lecturer in the National Council of Educational Research and Training (NCERT) in India. He organized over sixty math expositions and fairs in India, Nigeria and the United States, and participated actively in four International Congress on Mathematical Education (ICME) conferences.

He inspired many concepts and showed them through demonstrative displays by his students. Conduct of Bharat Dharshan, World Exhibition, three-day three-tier Math Expositions to make all his math students walk across the curriculum which was discussed, and research papers on subjects from English to Social Studies by students studying from 7 to 12 Standards was a great contribution made by him to the students and to The Muthialpet High School, Chennai where he was a teacher.

He could pick the brightest of students and discuss esoteric topics such as Boolean algebra, Ramanujan's theorems and at same time deploy easy-to-understand teaching tools for teaching mathematics and English. As a class teacher, he could reach across to the poorest performers and made them cross average levels in English and mathematics.

Although he hailed from a traditional family, he was always clad in a white kurta and dhoti spun out of khadi - rough and homespun cotton cloth that symbolized the Swadeshi concept of Gandhiji. He sported a Gandhian cap as well.

His vision and knowledge moved past the limits of race, language and religion. Personal and family interests were important in his mission for spreading knowledge and awareness and giving his students a sense of purpose in his to go beyond the boundary of a syllabus-oriented formal education of Mathematics. He showed these characteristics to everyone.

In addition, he was the founder and the curator-director of Ramanujan Museum & Math Education Centre which he helped establish in 1993. He was also one of the founders of the Association of Mathematics Teachers of India (AMTI) in 1965.

== Honours ==
He was awarded the National Science Award by the Government of India in 1991 and a State Award by the Tamil Nadu Science and Technology Centre for popularisation of mathematics education to enable children to learn mathematics with interest and enthusiasm.

== Philosophy ==
He advocated the use of no cost teaching aids and no cost, no material teaching aids, improvising them to illustrate mathematical concepts whenever they are introduced and almost lead a crusade against the mere rote learning techniques and drill. He also indicated the efficacy of introducing non-routine thinking when the child can grasp, using the concepts introduced, leading to problem solving techniques and innovative strategies.

== Memorial Meeting ==
A meeting to pay homage to his memory was organised on 8 July 2005 by Mr N Ravi of Hindu Newspaper and his son Kannan Srinivasan in the Dakshinamoorthy auditorium of the P.S. Higher Secondary School in Mylapore, Chennai. Many speakers who were his associates, admirers, friends and relatives spoke of the momentum he brought to the movement of mathematics education in the country. It was mentioned by more than one speaker at that time that the best tribute to his memory would be for mathematics teachers to make mathematics learning interesting for the children.

== Memorial ==
A commemorative website was created, for a short while (no longer actively maintained, as of 2012) by his immediate family. P.K. Srinivasan is survived by his wife, five sons, and five daughters. P.K. Srinivasan's obituary was published in the newspaper The Hindu.

== Books and articles ==
- Maths Club Activities
- A Mathematical Delight
- Number Fun with a Calendar
- How to Promote Creativity in Learning Mathematics - published by Lakshmi Ganapathy Educational and Charitable Trust, Chennai, India.
- Ramanujam Memorial Number Vol 1 - Letter and Reminiscences - a compilation (Ed.)
- Ramanujam Memorial Number Vol 2 - An Inspiration (Ed.)
- Introduction to the Creativity of Ramanujan - Instruction Guides to Primary, Middle and High School Teachers
- Game Way Math - published by Lakshmi Ganapathy Educational and Charitable Trust, Chennai, India.
- Mathematics and Magic Squares.

== Book reviews ==
Srinivasan was a prominent reviewer of math books in the weekly Book Review column of the Indian newspaper The Hindu in Chennai:

- Applications of Vedic Mathematics
- Fun with Mathematics

== Personal ==
P.K. Srinivasan was the strict father of ten children, but most of his professional colleagues did not know he had such a large family. His wife, Alamelu Srinivasan, has been credited with bringing up their children almost single-handedly. She died in Chennai on 10 November 2012.

== See also ==
- List of Indian mathematicians
