= Virahanka =

Indian prosodist and mathematician

Virahanka (Devanagari: विरहाङ्क) was an Indian prosodist who is also known for his work on mathematics. He may have lived in the 6th century, but it is also possible that he worked as late as the 8th century.

His work on prosody builds on the Chhanda-sutras of Pingala (4th century BCE), and was the basis for a 12th-century commentary by Gopala. He was the first to propose the Fibonacci Sequence.

== See also ==
- Indian mathematicians
