= Nṛsiṃha =

16th century Indian astronomer and mathematician

Nṛsiṃha (born c. 1586) was an Indian astronomer and mathematician from Golagrama. He was the son of Kṛṣṇa Daivajña, who came from a lineage of astronomers and mathematicians based in Golagrama. He is known to have written the book Saurabhāṣya, a commentary on Sūrysidhānta. Nṛsiṃha also wrote Sidhāntaśromaṇi-Vāsanāvārttika a commentary on the Gaṇitādhyāya and Golādhyāya of Sidhāntaśiromaṇi-Vāsanābhāṣya of Bhāskara II.

Nṛsiṃha had four sons: Divākara (born 1606), Kamalākara, Gopinātha and Ranganātha.

== Works ==
Nṛsiṃha wrote many books related to astronomy, including:

- Saurabhāṣya, a commentary on Sūrysidhānt
- Sidhāntaśromaṇi-Vāsanāvārttika, a commentary on the Gaṇitādhyāya
- Golādhyāya of Sidhāntaśiromaṇi-Vāsanābhāṣya of Bhāskara II
