= Lakkoju Sanjeevaraya Sarma =

Indian mathematician (1907–1998)

Lakkoju Sanjeevaraya Sharma
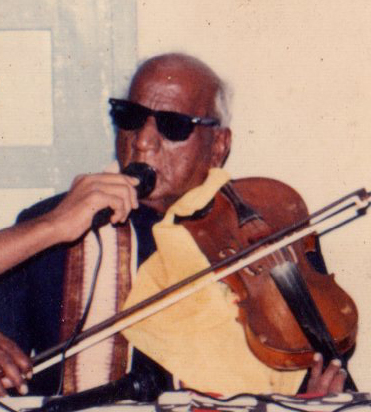
- Born: 27 November 1907; Kallur, Kadapa district, Andhra Pradesh, India
- Died: 2 December 1998 (aged 91); Srikalahasti
- Awards: Ganita Brahma
- Scientific career
- Fields: Mathematics, Avadhanam

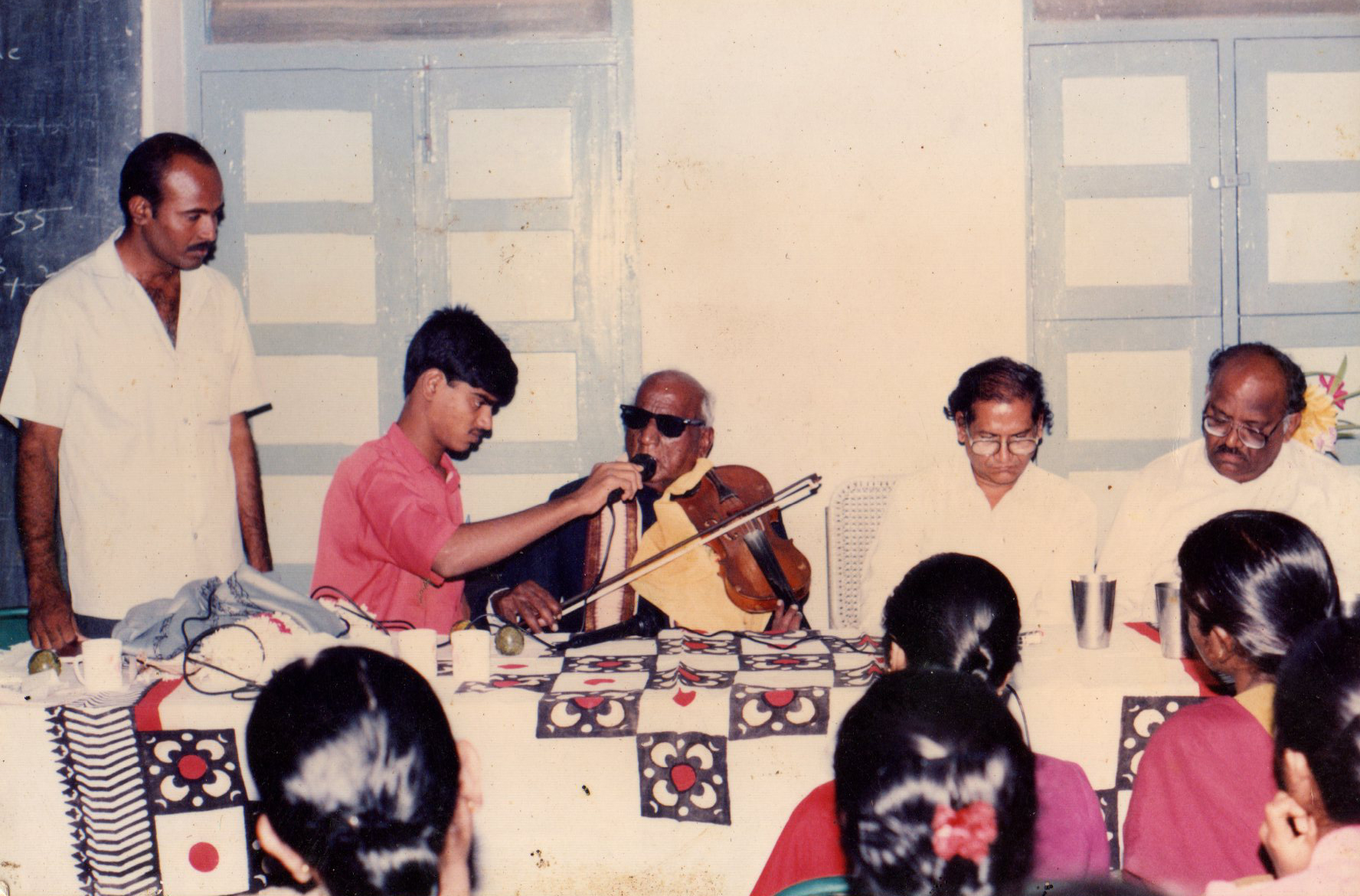
Sharma playing his violin and answering arduous math questions instantly in a convention held in Nellore, Andhra Pradesh

Lakkoju Sanjeevaraya Sarma (27 November 1907 – 2 December 1998) was an Indian mathematician. He gave many mathematical Avadhanams (Ganitavadhanams), educated people and surprised the elite.

== Early life ==
Lakkoju Sanjeevaraya Sarma was born at Kalluru village of Proddatur mandal in Kadapa district. His parents were Lakkoju Pedda Pullayyachary and Nagamamba. He was born blind and had no formal education. He married Adilakshmamma at the age of 19. He learnt mathematics when his sister recited what she learnt at school at home.

== Career ==
Sharma gave his first performance at Andhra Mahasabha at Nandyala on 15 November 1928, chaired by Sarvepalli Radhakrishnan. He was invited to New Delhi by Jawaharlal Nehru and performed before President Rajendra Prasad along with other dignitaries. He traveled widely and gave about 7,000 performances in Andhra Pradesh, Tamil Nadu, Karnataka, Maharashtra and Delhi. One of his most memorable performances was on 7 December 1966 at Sri Krishna Devaraya Andhra Bhasha Nilayam. He received many gold medals, honors and felicitations.

Sarma prepared an Indian Calendar extending 4,000 years.

Sarma was invited to visit the United States in 1993 by the Telugu community. He could not attend due to visa problems. Sri Venkateswara University honored him with a doctorate in 1996.

Sanjeeva Raya Sarma was poor. Capt.Dr.Mohan Rao of Rajampet introduced him to Pundit Nehru, who arranged a monthly sustenance of ₹300 until his death. He played the violin every evening at Sri Kalahasthiswara temple for an honorarium from the Devasthanam authorities. In 1998 the "Ganitha Brahma" died at the feet of SriKaalaHastheeswara. Sanjeevaraya Sarma and his wife were invited to Rajampeta (Kadapa Dist.) in 1960 by Capt. Dr. Mohana Rao Varanasi to give a performance at Govt.High School. The highlights were answering mathematical problems by playing his Violin along with songs like "భరీయింప జాలనీ బ్లాకుమార్కెట్టూ భారతీయులారా ..." (Very difficult to get on with black market). Later, impressed by his talent, Dr. Mohan Rao introduced Sanjeevaraya to many other Schools and Colleges for performances, and also to help him financially with performance-fee.

His unique feat was giving the exact number of Paddy seeds that can be arranged in doubling progression from one to 17 million on 64 squares of a Chess Board. He could easily reveal the Day, Tidhi and Zodiac of any given date in the calendar.

Born blind, he never went to any school but learnt numbers and imagined their compounded shapes to spontaneously give a solution to any problem, faster than the Computer. Ms.Shakunthala Devi, the Mathematical Wizard also praised his enviable acumen.
