= Gaṇita-sāra-saṅgraha =

Mathematics text written by Māhāvīrācharya

Information
- Religion: Jainism
- Author: Māhāvīrācharya
- Language: Sanskrit
- Period: 9th century

Gaṇitasārasan̄graha (Compendium on the gist of Mathematics) is a mathematics text written by Māhāvīrācharya. It is the first text completely written on mathematics with questions asked in it being completely different from ones asked in previous texts composed in the Indian subcontinent. In the 9th century, during Amoghavarsha's rule Mahaviracharya wrote Ganitsara sangraha which is the first textbook on arithmetic in present day. The book describes in details the current method of finding Lowest Common Multiple (LCM).

== Structure ==
1. Sangyaādhikāra (Terminology)
2. Parikarmavyāvahāra (Arithmetical operations)
3. Kālaswarnavyavahāra (Fractions)
4. Prakīrñakvyavahāra (Miscellaneous problems)
5. Trairāshika (Rule of three)
6. Miśravyavahāra (Mixed problems)
7. Kśetragaṇita vyavahāra (Measurement of Areas)
8. Khātvyavahāra (calculations regarding excavations)
9. Chāyāvyavahāra (Calculations relating to shadows)

== Quotes ==
The work praises mathematics as follows:

लौकिके वैदिके वापि तथा सामयिकेऽपि यः।
व्यापारस्तत्र सर्वत्र संख्यानमुपयुज्यते॥

Meaning: All the extant things in three worlds can't exist without their foundation being in mathematics.

The end of the first chapter Sangyaādhikāra describes the following eight qualities of a mathematician:

लघुकरणोहापोहानालस्यग्रहणधारणोपायैः।
व्यक्तिकरांकविशिष्टैर् गणकोऽष्टाभिर् गुणैर् ज्ञेयः॥

Meaning: A mathematician is to be known by eight qualities: conciseness, inference, confutation, vigour in work and progress, comprehension, concentration of mind and by the ability of finding solutions and uncovering quantities by investigation.
