= S. N. Seshadri =

Indian control engineer (1937–1986)

- Born: March 15, 1937; Kerala, India
- Died: February 2, 1986 (aged 48)
- Known for: Control systems for satellite communication
- Awards: 1978 Shanti Swarup Bhatnagar Prize
- Scientific career
- Fields: Control Systems; Power Electronics
- Institutions: Bhabha Atomic Research Centre

Sekharipuram Narayaniyer Seshadri (1937–1986) was an Indian control engineer and the head of the Reactor Control Division of the Bhabha Atomic Research Centre. He established the control systems for the Satellite Receiving Station at Arvi, near Pune and the Ooty Radio Telescope. Subsequent to the bombing of Air India Flight 182 in June 1985, he conducted the examination of the cockpit voice recorder and air traffic control tapes.

Seshadri was known for his work on the control systems for satellite communication, earth station antennas, tracking and telemetering of rockets, and traction motors for high power locomotives and his researches have been documented in a number of articles. He was an elected fellow of the Indian Academy of Sciences. The Council of Scientific and Industrial Research, the apex agency of the Government of India for scientific research, awarded him the Shanti Swarup Bhatnagar Prize for Science and Technology, one of the highest Indian science awards for his contributions to Engineering Sciences in 1978. He died on 2 February 1986, at the age of 48. The Indian Physics Association has instituted an annual award, S. N. Seshadri Memorial Instrumentation Award to recognize excellence in indigenous instrumentation development in physical sciences.

== Selected bibliography ==
- Srinivasan, M.; Dharmadhikari, M.; Karkera, B. N.; Mahindroo, P. N.; Ray, A. K.; Seshadri, S. N. (1973). "Safety and control systems of the Purnima reactor". Symposium on Nuclear Science and Engineering: 1–10.
- Rao, Dhanvada M.; Seshadri, S. N. (1976). "Application of radial-splitters for improved wide-angle diffuser performance in blowdown tunnel". Journal of Aircraft. 13 (7): 538–540. doi:10.2514/3.44542.
- D. M. Rao, S. N. Seshadri (1976). "Application of radial-splitters for improved wide-angle diffuser performance in a blowdown tunnel". Journal of Aircraft. 13 (7): 538–540. doi:10.2514/3.44542.
- Ray, A. K.; Seshadri, S. N. (1985). "Special features of the safety and control systems of the Dhruva reactor". Pramana - Journal of Physics. 24 (1–2): 179–192. Bibcode:1985Prama..24..179R. doi:10.1007/BF02894828. S2CID 121230852.
- S. N. Seshadri, K. Y. Narayan (1987). "Shock-induced separated flows on the lee surface of delta wings" (PDF). The Aeronautical Journal. 91 (903): 128–141. doi:10.1017/S0001924000091387. S2CID 55119972.
