= Srinivasacharya Raghavan =

Indian mathematician (1934-2014)

- Born: 11 April 1934; Thillaisthanam, Tanjore district, Madras Presidency, British India (now Thanjavur district, Tamil Nadu, India)
- Died: 7 October 2014 (aged 80); Chennai, Tamil Nadu, India
- Awards: Shanti Swarup Bhatnagar Award
- Scientific career
- Fields: Mathematics

Srinivasacharya Raghavan (11 April 1934 – 7 October 2014), was an Indian mathematician who worked in number theory. He was born in Thillaisthanam, Thanjavur, Tamil Nadu. After completing B.A. (Hons) from St. Joseph's College, Tiruchirapalli, he joined TIFR in 1954 as research student, and completed his Ph.D. in 1960 under the supervision of Professors K. Chandrasekharan and K.G. Ramanathan. He was affiliated with TIFR from 1956 until retirement in 1994, and served as Dean of Mathematics Faculty during 1986–89. He played an important role in the development of the TIFR Centre for Applicable Mathematics (now TIFR CAM) at Bangalore in its initial years. He also held visiting appointments at the Institute for Advanced Study, Princeton, USA, Sonderforschungsberiech at University of Goettingen, Germany, SPIC Mathematical Institute (now Chennai Mathematical Institute) and taught at the Centre for Advanced Studies in Mathematics at the University of Mumbai for many years.

Raghavan estimated the Fourier coefficients of Siegel modular forms yielding a generalization of Hardy-Ramanujan-Hecke asymptotic formula for representation by positive definite quadratic forms. His other notable findings include the determination of the structure of singular Siegel modular forms, application of Hecke's Grenzprozess to analytic continuation of non-holomorphic Eisenstein series of degree 3 as forerunner of Weissauer's deep generalisation, Ramanathan-Raghavan's analogue over algebraic number fields of Oppenheim's result on density of values of irrational indefinite quadratic (zero) forms, and Dani-Raghavan's result on density of irrational euclidean frames under familiar discrete groups following Kronecker, Rangachari-Raghavan's investigation of Ramanujan's integral identities. He also published about 40 research articles and guided four students for their PhD.

He contributed research papers to many international journals of renown and received many honours. He was awarded the Shanti Swarup Bhatnagar Prize for Science and Technology in Mathematical Science in 1979 He was also a Fellow of the Indian Academy of Sciences. He also served as member of the INSA Council and as chairman of the editorial board of the Proceedings (Math.Sci.) of IASc.

Prof. Raghavan served as Academic Secretary and Council Member of the Indian Mathematical Society during 1970-75 and was a member of the editorial board of the Journal of the Indian Mathematical Society for many years. He was a coauthor of Homological Methods in Commutative Algebra. He retired as Senior Professor from the Tata Institute of Fundamental Research (TIFR), Mumbai in 1994, died in Chennai, peacefully, due to cancer. He was married, and had a son, daughter-in-law and two grandsons.
