= Amit Garg =

Indian mathematician (born 1978)

Dr Amit Garg
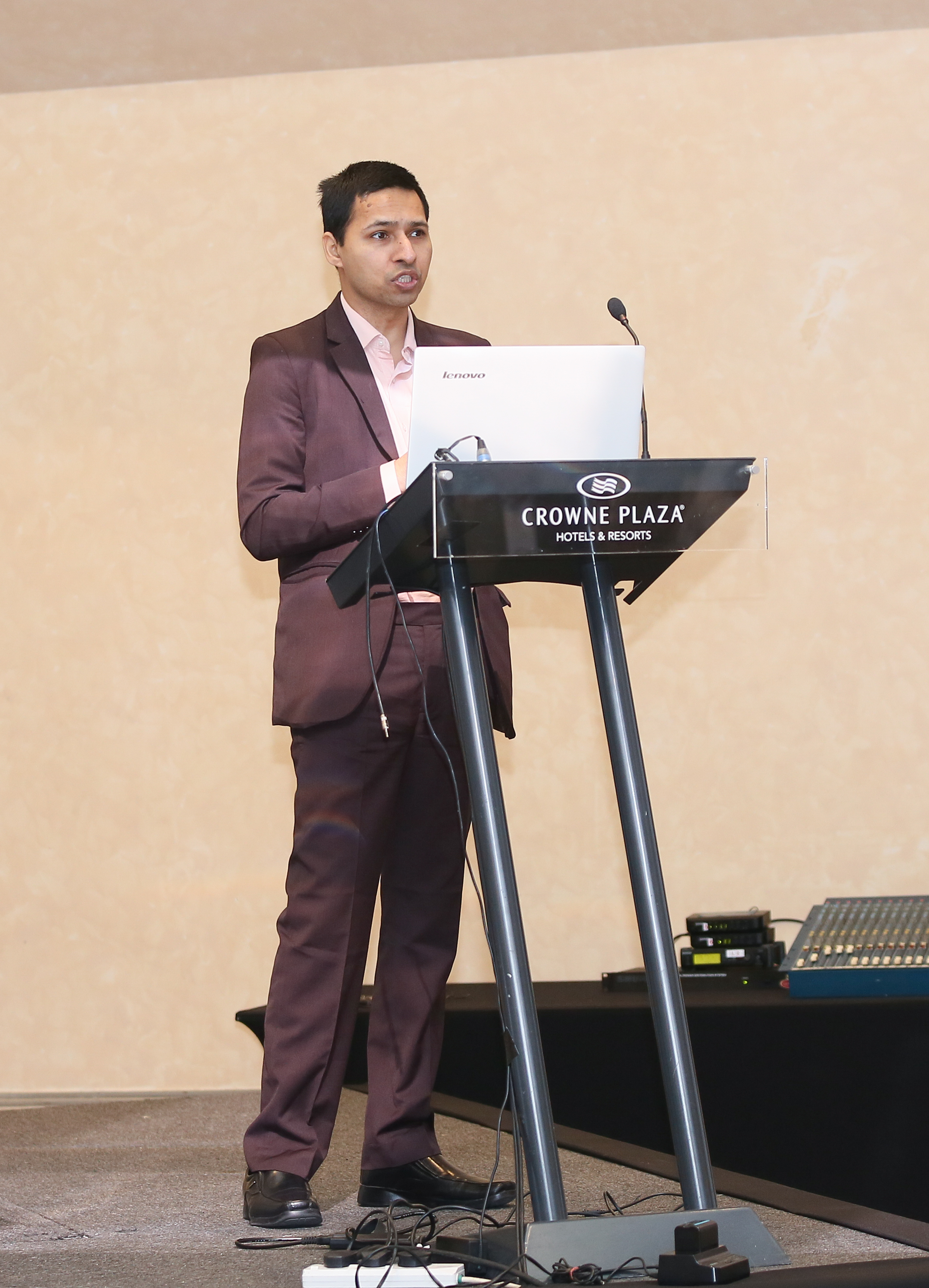
- Dr Amit Garg
- Born: Amit Garg; India
- Title: World Record March 2012 (Mental Division); Mind Sports Olympiad 2012 (Mental Calculation World Championship, Silver Medal); Mental Calculation World Cup 2012 (6th place Most Versatile Calculator)

Dr Amit Garg is an Indian mathematician and mental calculator. He currently works as founder and CEO at ORMAE, a firm registered in USA, UAE & India which engages in building innovative products, consulting and training in Operations Research and Data Science.

On 15 March 2012, he broke the mental calculation world record of completing ten tasks to "divide a 10-digit number by a 5-digit number" in a record time of 5:45 minutes without any errors. These tasks were constructed by a program provided by Dr Ralf Laue, author of the Book of Alternative Records and Chairman of Mental Calculation World Cup, such that there are no remainders. The previous record holder was Willem Bouman from the Netherlands with a time of 6:07 minutes. This world record was accepted at Guinness World Records, Limca Book of World Records and UK's Book of Alternative Records. As a world record holder in mental calculation, Ralf Laue confirmed him as participant in the 5th Mental Calculation World Cup 2012 to be conducted at Germany.

On 22 August 2012, he won the silver medal in the Mental Calculation competition at the annually conducted Mind Sports Olympiad in London (UK). He was the first Indian to receive any of the medals in this category since the inception of this event in 1997. On 1 October 2012, he received a sixth rank in the "most versatile calculator" category based on his performance in surprise tasks at the fifth Mental Calculation World Cup in Germany. He secured a 10th place in the overall ranking based on combination of standard and surprise tasks.

On 5 December 2017, he astonished students at Middlesex University, Dubai using his mathematical feats and spoke on impact of applied mathematics in different industries. On 26 February 2018 – 2 March 2018, he exhibited Math Show and business impact of Optimization & Analytics to 500+ students, 100+ educators from 100+ schools as key honored speaker at 5 day science show at Mauritius organized by University of Mauritius and Unesco. On 24 May 2018, he displayed his mathematical feat at University of Auckland, Auckland University of Technology, University of Waikato and few companies in New Zealand.
