= Chennas Narayanan Namboodiripad =

15th century Indian mathematician

Chennas Narayanan Namboodiripad (born 1428) was a 15th-century mathematician and Tantra ritualist from Kerala, India.

Narayanan Namboodiripad was considered to be an authority in the fields of Vaasthusaastram (Indian Architecture), Mathematics and Tantram. He authored a book titled Thanthra Samuchayam which is still considered as the authentic reference manual in the field of temple architecture and rituals.

Other contributions to mathematics include:

- A method of arriving at a circle starting with a square, and successively making it a regular octagon, a regular 16-sided, a 32-sided, 64-sided polygons, etc.
- Co-ordinate system of fixing points in a plane.
- Converting a square to a regular hexagon having approximately equal area.
- Finding the width of a regular octagon, given the perimeter.

== See also ==
- Indian Mathematics
