= Navin M. Singhi =

Indian mathematician (born 1949)

N. M. Singhi
- Born: 1949 (age 76–77)
- Citizenship: Indian
- Education: University of Mumbai
- Occupation: Mathematician
- Known for: Combinatorics and Graph Theory
- Awards: Shanti Swarup Bhatnagar Prize for Science and Technology
- Scientific career
- Fields: Combinatorics, Graph Theory, and Computer science
- Workplaces: TIFR, University of Mumbai, Indian Statistical Institute, IIT Mumbai
- Doctoral advisor: S. S. Shrikhande

Navin Madhavprasad Singhi (born 1949) is an Indian mathematician and a Professor Emeritus at Tata Institute of Fundamental Research, Mumbai, specializing in combinatorics and graph theory. He is the recipient of the prestigious Shanti Swarup Bhatnagar Prize for Science and Technology. Singhi is known for his research in block designs, projective planes, Intersection graphs of hypergraphs, and coding theory. He was a visiting professor at IIT Mumbai, University of Mumbai, Indian Statistical Institute and other various universities in the United States and Europe.

== Early life ==
Singhi was born in Indore and raised in Goregaon, Mumbai and earned a M.A. in mathematics from the University of Mumbai.

== Career ==
Singhi earned a Ph.D. (1974) from the University of Mumbai, his advisor was S. S. Shrikhande. Professor Singhi is a Fellow of the Indian National Science Academy.
