= New Media Technology College =

Educational institution in Dublin, Ireland

New Media Technology College, later rebranded as National Media College, was an educational institution in Dublin, Ireland. Operating from 2000 until 2014, it formerly offered courses in film, photography, animation, game design, music, performing arts, graphic design and journalism. In 2014, the college was suspended from a visa program following "serious allegations" regarding its visa management process for international students. The college subsequently went into liquidation, and closed in 2014.

== History ==
New Media Technology College (NMTC) opened in 2000, and initially operated from the basement of 13 Harcourt Street in Dublin city centre. The college later expanded to occupy more of the building.

By 2004, NMTC had signed a 2-year deal with the European Broadcasting Union (EBU) to deliver new media eLearning programmes. A design company, associated with the NMTC, also won a contract to create an animated 3D logo for the EBU, which was shown during the advertising breaks for the 2012 Eurovision Song Contest broadcast. Students and staff of the college won Golden Spiders and Digital Media Awards.

In 2013, NMTC rebranded as National Media College (NMC). By 2014, the National Media College (NMC), formerly known as New Media Technology College (NMTC), had been suspended from a visa program for international students after "serious allegations" regarding its visa management process. The college subsequently went into liquidation and closed in 2014.
