= Savda =

Savda Banana city khandeshi
- City
- Location in Maharashtra, India
- Coordinates: 21.15°N 75.88°E
- Country: India
- State: Maharashtra
- District: Jalgaon
- Elevation: 231 m (758 ft)

Population (2011)
  - Total: 20,584

Languages
  - Official: Marathi
- Time zone: UTC+5:30 (IST)
- PIN: 425502

Savda is a city and a municipal council in Jalgaon district in the Indian state of Maharashtra. It is also known as Banana City for production of bananas at a good scale.

== Geography ==
Savda is located at 21.15°N 75.88°E. It has an average elevation of 231 metres (757 feet).

== Demographics ==
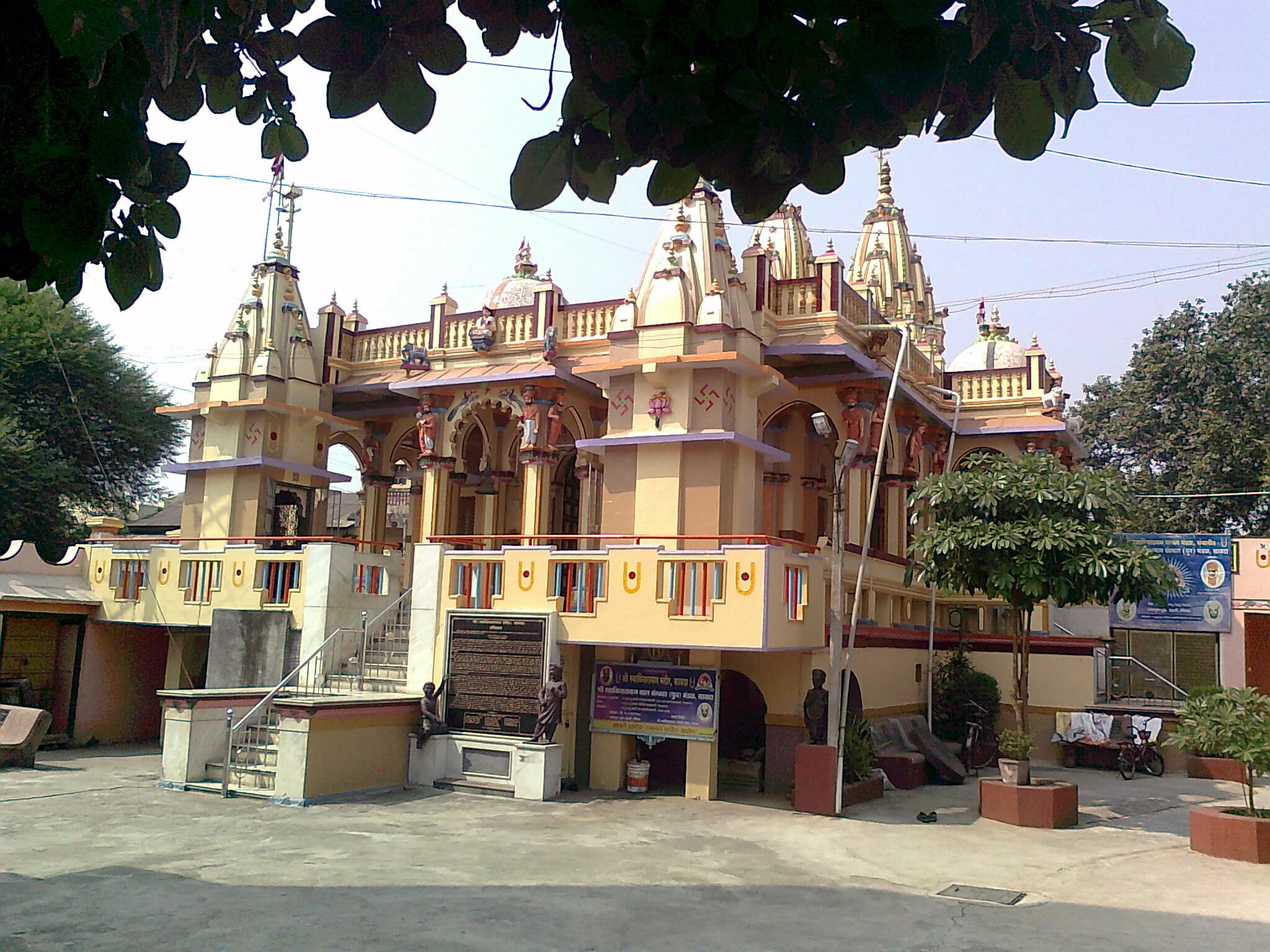
Swaminarayan Mandir at Savda

At the 2011 India census, Savda had a population of 20,584. Males constitute 52% of the population and females 48%. Savda has an average literacy rate of 72%, lower than the national average of 74.5%: male literacy is 78%, and female literacy is 65%. In Savda, 13% of the population is under 6 years of age. Freedom Fighters from Savda had fought in the Quit India Movement of 1942.

Year	Male	Female	Total Population	Change	Religion (%)							
Year	Male	Female	Total Population	Change	Hindu	Muslim	Christian	Sikhs	Buddhist	Jain	Other religions and persuasions	Religion not stated
2001	9996	9336	19332	-	58.939	31.099	0.052	0.134	7.728	1.454	0.569	0.026
2011	10637	9947	20584	0.065	58.084	36.387	0.175	0.029	3.624	1.287	0.053	0.360
