= Association of Mathematics Teachers of India =

The Association of Mathematics Teachers of India or AMTI is an academically oriented body of professionals and students interested in the fields of mathematics and mathematics education.

The AMTI's main base is Tamil Nadu, but it has recently been spreading its network in other parts of India, particularly in South India.

== Examinations and Olympiads ==
=== National Mathematics Talent Contest ===
AMTI conducts a National Mathematics Talent Contest or NMTC at Primary (Gauss Contest) (Standards 5 and 6), Sub-junior (Kaprekar Contest) (Standards 7 and 8), Junior (Bhaskara Contest) (Standards 9 and 10), Inter(Ramanujan Contest) (Standards 11 and 12) and Senior (Aryabhata Contest) (B.Sc.) levels. Over 125,000 students from 332 institutions across India participate in the test. For students at the Junior and Inter levels from Tamil Nadu, the NMTC also plays the role of Regional Mathematical Olympiad. Although the question papers are different for Junior and Inter levels, students from both levels may be chosen to appear at INMO based on their performance.

The NMTC is usually held around the last week of October. A preliminary examination is conducted earlier (in September) for all levels except B.Sc. students. Students (Junior and Inter) qualifying the preliminary examination are invited for an Orientation Camp one week before the NMTC, where Olympiad problems and theories are taught. This is also useful for those students qualifying further for INMO.

=== Grand Achievement Test ===
This test is for students studying in 12th standard under the Tamil Nadu State Board. It is intended to give a perfectly simulated atmosphere of the board's examination.

== Training Activities ==
=== Ten-week training session ===
In 2005, AMTI started a ten-week training programme for students for Olympiad-related problems. The training batches were split into:

- Primary level: Standards 4 to 6
- Sub-junior level: Standards 7 and 8
- Junior level: Standards 9 and 10
- Inter level: Standards 11 and 12

Around 85 students attended the ten-week training session.

AMTI conducted the programme again in 2006, and received a much better response.

== Workshops and conferences ==
The AMTI has been organizing conferences in different parts of the country to meet and deliberate issues of mathematics education, particularly at the school level.

== Notable office bearers ==
P. K. Srinivasan, a famous teacher of mathematics, was the first Editor of the magazine Junior Mathematician (1990 to 1994) and the Academic Secretary of AMTI from 1981 to 1994.
