= List of historic Indian texts =

This article attempts to capture in one place the names of books and other works written in ancient India. For the purpose of this list, we consider all books written in the Indian subcontinent up to and including the Mughal era as being 'ancient books'.

== Collections ==
Each collection represents a set of books that are collectively known by the collection's name. In the list of books (shown below the table of collections), each book also refers to the collection it belongs to (if it does).

Name	Description	Alternate Names	Date
Vedas	Sacred hymns on 5 supreme gods led by Surya, which are a large body of texts originating in ancient India. Composed in Vedic Sanskrit, the texts constitute the oldest layer of Sanskrit literature and the oldest scriptures of Hinduism. There are four Vedas, and these constitute the Hindu canon (but they are largely religious scriptures, some telling it to be God's words). Each Veda has four subdivisions – the Samhitas (mantras and benedictions), the Aranyakas (text on rituals, ceremonies, sacrifices and symbolic-sacrifices), the Brahmanas (commentaries on rituals, ceremonies and sacrifices), and the Upanishads (texts discussing meditation, philosophy and spiritual knowledge).	Samhita	1500-800 BCE
Shakhas	Vedic school. Each school taught a Veda in a specific way, over time evolving specific styles and emphasis, based on how / by whom / where it was taught.		
Brahmanas	Commentary and elaboration on vedas and description of religious procedures.		900-500 BCE
Upanishads	Philosophy in response to Vedas and Brahmanas. There are 108 Upnishads, among which 13 are considered the principal ones.		800-400 BCE
Vedanta	Later commentary on the Vedas, Brahmanas and Upanishads.		
Itihasa	Ramayana and Mahabharata are known as the itihasas (‘thus it happened’).		present form c.800 BCE for Mahabharata and c.300 BCE for Ramayana
Pali Canon	Essential collections of teachings of Shakyamuni Buddha, as written by his followers, three centuries later.	Tripiṭaka	
Puranas	Historic texts (usually about a royal lineage or local legends) - written by court-appointed historians. Usually contrasted with historical descriptions in vedas, brahmanas, etc., that are written by priests.		c.700 BCE (origins); 200 CE to 1000 CE (for canonical ones) (some portions, especially, but not limited to, portions of Bhavishya Purana were added until 1850 CE)
Dharmaśāstra	Collection and description of laws (man-made and natural).		300 BCE - 300 CE
Sangam literature	Collection of texts on ethics, polity, love, and ancient Indian lifestyle, especially in the southern part of the peninsular India.		300 BCE - 300 CE

== Books ==
=== Key ===
- Subject Area - subject area of the book
- Topic - topic (within the subject area)
- Collection - belongs to a collection listed in the table above
- Date - date (year range) book was written/composed
- Geographic Region - as it was known at the time of writing, and the modern name, if known

Book	Subject Area	Topic	Collection	Language	Author	Date	Geographic Region
Rig Veda	Hindu hymns about various gods, scientific revelations and references to historic events.	Part 1 of the four part Hindu canon.	Veda/Samhita	Sanskrit	No concrete information available, but attributed to several rishis.	1500-1200 BCE	Sapta Sindhva (Indus region)
Yajur Veda	Hindu sacrificial knowledge.	Part 3 of the four part Hindu canon.	Veda/Samhita	Sanskrit	No concrete information available, but attributed to several 'rishis'	1500-500 BCE	Sapta Sindhva (Indus region)
Sama Veda	Hindu music and arts.	Part 2 of the four part Hindu canon.	Veda/Samhita	Sanskrit		1500-500 BCE	
Atharva Veda	Hindu medicine, magic, sorcery.	Part 4 of the four part Hindu canon.	Veda/Samhita	Sanskrit	Attributed to rishis "Atharvana" and Angirasa.	1500-500 BCE	
Taittiriya Shakha		Recension of Yajur Veda	Shakha	Sanskrit			
Sushruta Samhita	Medicine and Surgery			Sanskrit	Suśruta		
Shaunaka Shakha		Recension of Atharva Veda	Shakha	Sanskrit			
Paippalada Shakha		Recension of Atharva Veda	Shakha	Sanskrit			
Shulba Sutras	Hinduism	Geometry related to fire altar construction in Hinduism, including pythagorean theorem and square root	Śrauta	Sanskrit		200 CE	
Satapatha Brahmana	Hindu sacrificial knowledge.	Commentary on Yajur Veda	Brahmana	Sanskrit		500 CE - 1200 CE	
Aitareya Brahmana	Hindu vedic practices.	Commentary on Rig Veda	Brahmana	Sanskrit			
Kaushitaki Brahmana		Commentary on Rig Veda		Sanskrit			
Taittiriya Brahmana	Hindu sacrificial knowledge.	Commentary on Yajur Veda	Brahmana	Sanskrit			
Samavidhana Brahmana	Hindu music and arts.	Commentary on Sama Veda	Brahmana	Sanskrit			
Arseya Brahmana	Hindu music and arts.	Commentary on Sama Veda	Brahmana	Sanskrit			
Devatadhyaya Brahmana	Hindu music and arts.	Commentary on Sama Veda	Brahmana	Sanskrit			
Shakdwipiya Brahmana	Hindu music and arts.	Commentary on Sama Veda	Brahmana	Sanskrit			
Tandyamaha Brahmana	Hindu music and arts.	Commentary on Sama Veda	Brahmana	Sanskrit			
Aitareya Aranyaka				Sanskrit			
Kaushitaki Aranyaka				Sanskrit			
Taittiriya Upanishad			Upanishad	Sanskrit			
Maitri Upanishad			Upanishad	Sanskrit			
			Mimamsa	Sanskrit			
	Theravada Buddhism		Buddhist Pali Canon	Pali			
	Yoga			Sanskrit			
Aṣṭādhyāyī	Sanskrit Grammar	Vyākaraṇa		Sanskrit	Pāṇini	4th Century - 6th Century C.E	Purushapura(Peshawar)
Ramayana		Life of Rama, a prince of the Sun dynasty.		Sanskrit	Valmiki		
Mahabharata		Story of Arjuna, of royal line of Kuru Kingdom		Sanskrit	Lord Ganesha while Veda Vyasa narrated it.	400 BCE - 400 CE	
Purva Mimamsa Sutras				Sanskrit	Rishi Jaimini	300 BCE - 200 BCE	
Bhagavad Gita		Krishna's advice to Arjuna on duty.	Not a separate work. Part of Mahabharata.	Sanskrit	Veda Vyasa	200 BCE - 200 CE	
Panchatantra		Compilation of moral stories		Sanskrit	Vishnusharma	200 B.C.E	
Hatha Yoga Pradipika				Sanskrit			
Gheranda Samhita				Sanskrit			
Yoga Sutras of Patanjali				Sanskrit	Patanjali		
Vishnu Purana			Purana	Sanskrit			
Persian Wars				Greek	Herodotus		
Arthashastra	polity			Sanskrit	Chanakya (aka Kautilya)	Reign of Chandragupta Maurya (321 BCE - 301 BCE)	Magadha (Bihar)
Milinda Panha		Dialogues with King Milinda (Menander)		Pali		Reign of Menander (circa 150 BCE)	Sagala (Sialkot in Punjab)
Sangam literature				Tamil		100 B.C.E - 250 C.E	Tamil Nadu
Buddhacharita	Buddhism	Life of Shakyamuni Buddha		Sanskrit	Ashvagosha	Reign of [[Kanishka|Kanishka (100]])	Purushapura (Peshawar)
Shatkhandagama	Jainism			Prakrit	Dharasena	1st century BCE	Mudabidri (Karnataka)
Periplus of the Erythrean Sea		A naval guide to Indian commerce.		Greek		0-100 CE	
Manusmriti (aka Manava Dharmaśāstra)	Law, code of conduct.	Code of conduct as described by Manu.	Dharmaśāstra	Sanskrit			
Gaha Sattasai	Anthology of Poems			Prakrit	Hāla	20 - 24 CE (reign of Satavahana)	Amaravati (Andhra Pradesh)
			Puranas	Sanskrit			
Kamasutra	pleasure	A manual of love.		Sanskrit	Vātsyāyana		
Charaka Samhita	Medicine	Medical text.		Sanskrit	Charaka		
Siddhāntakaumudī	Sanskrit language	Sanskrit grammar. Rearranges and provides descriptions for Panini's Ashtadyayi.		Sanskrit	Bhattoji Diksita		
Mahabhashya	Sanskrit language	Sanskrit grammar		Sanskrit	Patanjali		
Devichandraguptam	Drama	Drama about Chandragupta II		Sanskrit	Vishakhadatta		
Aryabhatiya	Mathematics	Mathematics		Sanskrit	Āryabhaṭa		
Brāhmasphuṭasiddhānta	Mathematics	Mathematics		Sanskrit	Brahmagupta		
Mahabhaskariya	Mathematics	Mathematics		Sanskrit	Bhaskara I		
Nav Shatika	Mathematics	Mathematics		Sanskrit	Sridhara		Bengal
Maha-Siddhanta	Mathematics	Mathematics		Sanskrit	Aryabhata II		Bengal
Travels of Faxian	Social life	Travels in India during the Chandragupta II era		Classical Chinese	Faxian	Reign of Chandragupta II (375-415 CE)	Magadha (Bihar)
Shakuntala	Drama	Drama about a girl forgotten by her husband		Sanskrit	Kalidasa	Reign of Chandragupta II (375-415 CE)	Magadha (Bihar)
Meghadūta	Drama	Story of a cloud carrying a message amongst lovers		Sanskrit	Kalidasa	Reign of Chandragupta II (375-415 CE)	Magadha (Bihar)
Mrichakatika	Drama	Story of a poor Brahman falling in love with a courtesan.		Sanskrit	Shudraka	Reign of Chandragupta II (375-415 CE)	Magadha (Bihar)
Surya Siddhanta	Mathematics	Mathematics	Panchasiddhantika	Sanskrit	Varahamihira	575 C.E	Madhya Pradesh
Romaka Siddhanta	Mathematics	Mathematics	Panchasiddhantika	Sanskrit	Varahamihira	575 C.E	Madhya Pradesh
Paulisa Siddhanta	Mathematics	Mathematics	Panchasiddhantika	Sanskrit	Varahamihira	575 C.E	Madhya Pradesh
Vasishtha Siddhanta	Mathematics	Mathematics	Panchasiddhantika	Sanskrit	Varahamihira	575 C.E	Madhya Pradesh
Paitamaha Siddhanta	Mathematics	Mathematics	Panchasiddhantika	Sanskrit	Varahamihira	575 C.E	Madhya Pradesh
Harshacharita	Biography	Life of King Harsha Vardhana		Sanskrit	Bāṇabhaṭṭa	Reign of Harsha Vardhana (606-647 CE)	Thanesar (near Delhi)
In the footsteps of Buddha	Travel			Classical Chinese	Xuanzang	Reign of Harsha Vardhana (606-647 CE)	Thanesar (near Delhi)
In the footsteps of Buddha	Travel			Classical Chinese	Xuanzang	Reign of Pulakesin II (Pulikesi) (610-642 CE)	Badami (near Krishna river)
Samkhya verses				Sanskrit	Isvara Krishna		
Soundarya Lahari				Sanskrit	Sankaracharya		
Mattavilasa Prahasana				Sanskrit	Mahendravarman I	Reign of Mahendravarman I (Pallava) (600-630 CE)	Kancheepuram
Grahacāraṇibandhana	Parahita system of astronomical computations			Sanskrit	Haridatta	683 CE	Kerala
Slokavrittika	Reflection	Commentary on Shabara's Commentary on Jaimini's Mimamsa Sutras Part 1		Sanskrit	Kumarila Bhatta	Early 8th century	
Tantravrttika	Reflection	Commentary on Shabara's Commentary on Jaimini's Mimamsa Sutras Part 2		Sanskrit	Kumarila Bhatta	Early 8th century	
Tuptika	Reflection	Commentary on Shabara's Commentary on Jaimini's Mimamsa Sutras Part 3		Sanskrit	Kumarila Bhatta	Early 8th century	
Kataoka	Reflection	Commentary on Shabara's Commentary on Jaimini's Mimamsa Sutras Part 4		Sanskrit	Kumarila Bhatta	Early 8th century	
Prabhakara Mimamsa	Reflection			Sanskrit	Prabhakara Bhatta	6th Century	
Gaudapada Karika	Hindu Religion	Commentary on 'Māṇḍukya Kārikā'		Sanskrit	Gaudapada	6th Century	
Kāvyādarśa	Poetic			Sanskrit	Dandin	7th - 8th Century	Karnataka
Daśakumāracarita	Prose			Sanskrit	Dandin	7th - 8th Century	Karnataka
Avantisundarī	Prose	Story of the beautiful lady of Avanti		Sanskrit	Dandin	7th - 8th Century	Karnataka
Vivekacūḍāmaṇi	Hindu Religion	Advaita Vedanta		Sanskrit	Adi Shankara	Early 8th Century	Kerala
Upadeśasāhasri	Hindu Religion	Thousand teachings		Sanskrit	Adi Shankara	Early 8th Century	Kerala
Śataśloki	Hindu Religion	Upanishads		Sanskrit	Adi Shankara	Early 8th Century	Kerala
Daśaśloki	Hindu Religion	Who am I?		Sanskrit	Adi Shankara	Early 8th Century	Kerala
Ekaśloki	Hindu Religion	Essence of Vedanta		Sanskrit	Adi Shankara	Early 8th Century	Kerala
Pañcīkaraṇa	Hindu Religion	Primordial Elements		Sanskrit	Adi Shankara	Early 8th Century	Kerala
Ātma bodha	Hindu Religion	Awareness of Atman		Sanskrit	Adi Shankara	Early 8th Century	Kerala
Aparokṣānubhūti	Hindu Religion	Essential truth		Sanskrit	Adi Shankara	Early 8th Century	Kerala
Sādhana Pañcakaṃ	Hindu Religion	Vedantic Sadhana		Sanskrit	Adi Shankara	Early 8th Century	Kerala
Nirvāṇa Ṣaṭkam	Hindu Religion	The State of Nirvana		Sanskrit	Adi Shankara	Early 8th Century	Kerala
Manīśa Pañcakaṃ	Hindu Religion	Essence of Advaita Vedanta		Sanskrit	Adi Shankara	Early 8th Century	Kerala
Yati Pañcakaṃ	Hindu Religion	Greatness of the liberated person		Sanskrit	Adi Shankara	Early 8th Century	Kerala
Vākyasudha (Dṛg-Dṛśya-Viveka)	Hindu Religion			Sanskrit	Adi Shankara	Early 8th Century	Kerala
Tattva bodha	Hindu Religion	Awakening to the Reality		Sanskrit	Adi Shankara	Early 8th Century	Kerala
Vākya vṛtti	Hindu Religion	Direct perception of the Brahman		Sanskrit	Adi Shankara	Early 8th Century	Kerala
Siddhānta Tattva Vindu	Hindu Religion	The Song of Self		Sanskrit	Adi Shankara	Early 8th Century	Kerala
Nirguṇa Mānasa Pūja	Hindu Religion	Worship of the formless in ones mind		Sanskrit	Adi Shankara	Early 8th Century	Kerala
Prasnottara Ratna Malika	Hindu Religion	Q&A on Spiritual and Temporal Living		Sanskrit	Adi Shankara	Early 8th Century	Kerala
prabodhasudhakara	Hindu Religion	Oneness of Saguna Bhakti and Nirguna Bhakti		Sanskrit	Adi Shankara	Early 8th Century	Kerala
Naishkarmya Siddhi	Hindu Philosophy	Treatise on Advaita Vedanta		Sanskrit	Sureśvara	Approx. 8th Century	Kerala
svatma prakasika	Hindu Religion			Sanskrit	Adi Shankara	Early 8th Century	Kerala
Brahmasūtra	Hindu Religion	Commentary on Brahmasutra		Sanskrit	Adi Shankara	Early 8th Century	Kerala
Aitareya Upaniṣad (Rigveda)	Hindu Religion	Commentary on Rigveda		Sanskrit	Adi Shankara	Early 8th Century	Kerala
Bṛhadāraṇyaka Upaniṣad (Śukla Yajurveda)	Hindu Religion	Commentary on Sukla Yajurveda		Sanskrit	Adi Shankara	Early 8th Century	Kerala
Īśa Upaniṣad (Śukla Yajurveda)	Hindu Religion	Commentary on Isa Upanishad		Sanskrit	Adi Shankara	Early 8th Century	Kerala
Taittirīya Upaniṣad (Kṛṣṇa Yajurveda)	Hindu Religion	Commentary on Taittriya Upanishad		Sanskrit	Adi Shankara	Early 8th Century	Kerala
Śvetāśvatara Upaniṣad (Kṛṣṇa Yajurveda)	Hindu Religion	Commentary on Svetasvatara Upanishad		Sanskrit	Adi Shankara	Early 8th Century	Kerala
Kaṭha Upaniṣad (Kṛṣṇa Yajurveda)	Hindu Religion	Commentary on Katha Upanishad		Sanskrit	Adi Shankara	Early 8th Century	Kerala
Kena Upaniṣad (samaveda)	Hindu Religion	Commentary on Kena Upanishad		Sanskrit	Adi Shankara	Early 8th Century	Kerala
Chāndogya Upaniṣad (samaveda)	Hindu Religion	Commentary on Chandogya Upanishad		Sanskrit	Adi Shankara	Early 8th Century	Kerala
Māṇḍūkya Upaniṣad	Hindu Religion	Commentary on Mandukya Upanishad		Sanskrit	Adi Shankara	Early 8th Century	Kerala
Muṇḍaka Upaniṣad(Atharvaveda)	Hindu Religion	Commentary on Mandukya Upanishad		Sanskrit	Adi Shankara	Early 8th Century	Kerala
Praśna Upaniṣad(Atharvaveda)	Hindu Religion	Commentary on Prasna Upanishad		Sanskrit	Adi Shankara	Early 8th Century	Kerala
Bhagavadgīta (Mahabhārata)	Hindu Religion	Commentary on Bhagavadgita		Sanskrit	Adi Shankara	Early 8th Century	Kerala
Vishnu Sahasranama(Mahabhārata)	Hindu Religion	Commentary on Vishnu Sahasranama		Sanskrit	Adi Shankara	Early 8th Century	Kerala
Sānatsujātiya(Mahabhārata)	Hindu Religion	Commentary on Sanatsujatiya		Sanskrit	Adi Shankara	Early 8th Century	Kerala
Gāyatri Mantraṃ	Hindu Religion	Commentary on Gayathri Mantram		Sanskrit	Adi Shankara	Early 8th Century	Kerala
Nyayavinishchaya vivarana	Logic and Reasoning			Sanskrit	Akalanka Deva	8th Century	Tamil Nadu
Tattvartha Sutra	Jain Religion	Philosophy		Sanskrit	Akalanka Deva	8th Century	Tamil Nadu
Ṛjuvimalāpañcikā	Reflection			Sanskrit	Śālikanātha	800 C.E	
Dīpaśikhāpañcikā	Reflection			Sanskrit	Śālikanātha	800 C.E	
Nityashodashikarnava				Sanskrit			
Tantraraja Tantra	Self Realisation	Sriyantra		Sanskrit			
Govindakriti	Astronomy and Mathematics	Place value system and Sine table		Sanskrit	Govindasvami	800 - 860 CE	Kodungallur (Kerala)
Gaṇitasārasan̄graha	Mathematics	Algebra formulas		Kannada	Mahavira	850 C.E	Karnataka
Kavirajamarga	Kannada Language	Grammar & Poetics of Kannada Language		Kannada	Amoghavarsha I	850 C.E	Karnataka
Prashnottara Ratnamalika	Hindu Religion			Sanskrit	Amoghavarsha I	850 C.E	Karnataka
Laghu Bhaskariya Vivarana	Astronomy and Mathematics	Commentary on Lagu Bhaskara by Bhaskara I, established an Astronomical observatory		Sanskrit	Śaṅkaranārāyaṇa	869 CE	Kodungallur (Kerala)
Karpuramanjari Kavyamimamsa Bālabhārata Bālarāmāyaṇa Viddhaśālabhañjikā	Play Children's Ramayana and Mahabharata			Prakrit	Rajashekhara	880 CE	
Trisatika Pāṭīgaṇita	Mathematics	Separated algebra from arithmetic Formula for quadratic equations		Sanskrit	Śrīdharācārya	870 - 930 CE	Hugli (West Bengal)
Tantraloka	Hindu Religion	Tantra Philosophy		Sanskrit	Abhinavagupta	950 - 1016 C.E	
Tantrasara	Hindu Religion	Summary of Tantra		Sanskrit	Abhinavagupta	950 - 1016 C.E	
Dhikotidakarana	Astronomy	Calculating Solar and Lunar Eclipses			Śrīpati	1039 CE	
Dhruvamanasa	Astronomy	Calculating planetary longitudes, eclipses and planetary transits			Śrīpati	1056 CE	
Siddhantasekhara	Astronomy & Mathematics				Śrīpati	1056 CE	
Ganitatilaka	Mathematics	Extended the work done by Shridhara determining the rules for addition, subtraction, division, multiplication, square roots, cube roots, and quadratic equations			Śrīpati	1056 CE	
Mitākṣarā	Legal	Commentary on inheritance of property		Sanskrit	Vijñāneśvara	1055 C.E - 1126 C.E	Karnataka
Dāyabhāga	Legal	Commentary on inheritance of property		Sanskrit	Jimutavahana	12th Century	
Kalaviveka	Time	Auspicious timings		Sanskrit	Jimutavahana	12th Century	
Nyayaratna-mātrikā	Legal	Jurisprudence		Sanskrit	Jimutavahana	12th Century	
Siddhanta Shiromani	Mathematics	Mathematics		Sanskrit	Bhāskara II	1114 - 1185 C.E	Karnataka
Lilavati	Mathematics	Mathematics		Sanskrit	Bhāskara II	1114 - 1185 C.E	Karnataka
Bijaganita	Mathematics	Mathematics		Sanskrit	Bhāskara II	1114 - 1185 C.E	Karnataka
Gola Addhyaya	Mathematics	Mathematics		Sanskrit	Bhāskara II	1114 - 1185 C.E	Karnataka
Griha Ganitam	Mathematics	Mathematics		Sanskrit	Bhāskara II	1114 - 1185 C.E	Karnataka
Karun Kautoohal	Mathematics	Mathematics		Sanskrit	Bhāskara II	1114 - 1185 C.E	Karnataka
Bhagavata Purana	Religion	Various mythologic stories	Puranas	Sanskrit	Attributed to Vyasa	1100-1200 CE	
Shat-sthala-vachana	Hindu Religion	Six Stages of Salvation		Kannada	Basaveshwara	12th Century	Karnataka
Kala-jnana-vachana	Hindu Religion	Forecasts of the future		Kannada	Basaveshwara	12th Century	Karnataka
Mantragopya	Hindu Religion			Kannada	Basaveshwara	12th Century	Karnataka
Ghatachakra-vachana	Hindu Religion			Kannada	Basaveshwara	12th Century	Karnataka
Raja-yoga-vachana	Hindu Religion			Kannada	Basaveshwara	12th Century	
Rasendra Chudamani	Chemistry	Mercury and its processing for medicinal use		Sanskrit	Aacharya Somadeva	12th and 13th Century	
Brahmasutra Bhashya	Hindu Religion	Commentaries on Brahmasutras		Sanskrit	Madhvacharya	1238-1317 C.E	Karnataka
Anu Vyakhyana	Logic and Reasoning	Commentaries on Brahmasutras		Sanskrit	Madhvacharya	1238-1317 C.E	Karnataka
Nyaya Vivarana		Commentaries on Brahmasutras		Sanskrit	Madhvacharya	1238-1317 C.E	Karnataka
Anu Bhashya		Commentaries on Brahmasutras		Sanskrit	Madhvacharya	1238-1317 C.E	Karnataka
Ishavasya Upanishad Bhashya		Commentaries on Upanishads		Sanskrit	Madhvacharya	1238-1317 C.E	Karnataka
Kena Upanishad Bhashya		Commentaries on Upanishads		Sanskrit	Madhvacharya	1238-1317 C.E	Karnataka
Katha Upanishad Bhashya		Commentaries on Upanishads		Sanskrit	Madhvacharya	1238-1317 C.E	Karnataka
Mundaka Upanishad Bhashya		Commentaries on Upanishads		Sanskrit	Madhvacharya	1238-1317 C.E	Karnataka
Satprashna Upanishad Bhashya		Commentaries on Upanishads		Sanskrit	Madhvacharya	1238-1317 C.E	Karnataka
Mandukya Upanishad Bhashya		Commentaries on Upanishads		Sanskrit	Madhvacharya	1238-1317 C.E	Karnataka
Aitareya Upanishad Bhashya		Commentaries on Upanishads		Sanskrit	Madhvacharya	1238-1317 C.E	Karnataka
Taittireeya Upanishad Bhashya		Commentaries on Upanishads		Sanskrit	Madhvacharya	1238-1317 C.E	Karnataka
Brihadaranyaka Upanishad Bhashya)		Commentaries on Upanishads		Sanskrit	Madhvacharya	1238-1317 C.E	Karnataka
Chandogya Upanishad Bhashya		Commentaries on Upanishads		Sanskrit	Madhvacharya	1238-1317 C.E	Karnataka
Rigbhashyam		Commentaries on Rigveda		Sanskrit	Madhvacharya	1238-1317 C.E	Karnataka
Mahabharata Tatparya Nirnaya		Commentaries on Rigveda		Sanskrit	Madhvacharya	1238-1317 C.E	Karnataka
Krishnamruta Maharnava				Sanskrit	Madhvacharya	1238-1317 C.E	Karnataka
Sadachara Smruti				Sanskrit	Madhvacharya	1238-1317 C.E	Karnataka
Tantra Sara Sangraha				Sanskrit	Madhvacharya	1238-1317 C.E	Karnataka
Yati Pranava Kalpa				Sanskrit	Madhvacharya	1238-1317 C.E	Karnataka
Jayanti Nirnaya				Sanskrit	Madhvacharya	1238-1317 C.E	Karnataka
Nyasapaddhati				Sanskrit	Madhvacharya	1238-1317 C.E	Karnataka
Tithinirnaya				Sanskrit	Madhvacharya	1238-1317 C.E	
Tarka Bhasa	Logic and Reasoning	Exposition of Reasoning		Sanskrit	Kesava Mitra	1275 C.E	
Ratirahasya	Sex			Sanskrit			
Karmapradipika	Mathematics	Commentary on Bhaskara II's Lilavati			Narayana Pandita	1356 C.E	Karnataka
Ganita Kaumudi	Mathematics				Narayana Pandita	1356 C.E	Karnataka
Bijaganita Vatamsa	Mathematics	Algebra - Second order indeterminate equations			Narayana Pandita	1356 C.E	Karnataka
Golavada Madhyamanayanaprakara Mahajyanayanaprakara (Method of Computing Great Sines) Lagnaprakarana VenvarohaSphutacandrapti Aganita-grahacara Chandravakyani (Table of Moon-mnemonics)	Mathematics	infinite series, calculus, trigonometry, geometry, and algebra. Madhava-Leibniz Series			Madhava of Sangamagrama	1350 CE	Aloor, Irinjalakuda in Thrissur (Kerala)
Bhatadipika	Astronomy	Commentary on Āryabhaṭīya of Āryabhaṭa I			Parameshvara	1430 CE	Alathiyur (Kerala)
Karmadipika	Astronomy	Commentary on Mahabhaskariya of Bhaskara I			Parameshvara	1430 CE	Alathiyur (Kerala)
Paramesvari	Astronomy	Commentary on Laghubhaskariya of Bhaskara I			Parameshvara	1430 CE	Alathiyur (Kerala)
Sidhantadipika	Astronomy	Commentary on Mahabhaskariyabhashya of Govindasvāmi			Parameshvara	1430 CE	Alathiyur (Kerala)
Vivarana	Astronomy	Commentary on Surya Siddhanta and Lilāvati			Parameshvara	1430 CE	Alathiyur (Kerala)
Drgganita	Astronomy	Description of the Drig system			Parameshvara	1430 CE	Alathiyur (Kerala)
Goladipika	Astronomy	Spherical geometry and astronomy			Parameshvara	1430 CE	Alathiyur (Kerala)
Grahanamandana	Astronomy	Computation of eclipses			Parameshvara	1430 CE	Alathiyur (Kerala)
Grahanavyakhyadipika	Astronomy	rationale of the theory of eclipses			Parameshvara	1430 CE	Alathiyur (Kerala)
Vakyakarana	Astronomy	Methods for the derivation of several astronomical tables			Parameshvara	1430 CE	Alathiyur (Kerala)
	Medicine	Ma'dan ul Shifa		Arabic		Reign of Sikandar Lodi (1489-1517 CE)	Delhi
	Music	Lahjat I Sikandar Shahi		Arabic		Reign of Sikandar Lodi (1489-1517 CE)	Delhi
				Persian	Kabir		
Baburnama	Autobiography	Babur's life		Chagatai	Babur		Mughal Empire
Humayunnama	Biography	Humayun's life		Persian	Gulbadan Begum		Mughal Empire
Nimatnama-i-Nasiruddin-Shahi	Cooking	Cooking		Persian		Reign of Ghiyath Shah	
Tantrasangraha	Astronomy			Sanskrit	Nilakantha Somayaji	1501 CE	Tirur (Kerala)
Akbarnama	Chronicle	official chronicle of the reign of Akbar		Persian	Abu'l-Fazl ibn Mubarak	Reign of Akbar	
Yuktibhāṣā Drkkarana	Mathematics and Astronomy	Infinite series, Power series, Trigonometric series, Sine, Cosine, Tangent series, Taylor series		Malayalam	Jyeshtadeva	1550 CE	Alathiyur (Kerala)
Ganita-yukti-bhasa	Mathematics and Astronomy			Malayalam	Jyeshtadeva	1550 CE	
Yukti-dipika Laghu-vivrti Kriya-kramakari	Commentary on Tantrasamgraha				Shankara Variyar	1540 CE	Ottapalam (Kerala)
Praveśaka	Sanskrit grammar			Sanskrit	Achyutha Pisharadi	1580 CE	Kerala
Karaṇottama	Astronomy	Mean and Longitudes of planets		Sanskrit	Achyutha Pisharadi	1580 CE	Kerala
Uparāgakriyākrama	Astronomy	Lunar and solar eclipses		Sanskrit	Achyutha Pisharadi	1580 CE	Kerala
Sphuṭanirṇaya	Astronomy			Sanskrit	Achyutha Pisharadi	1580 CE	Kerala
Chāyāṣṭaka	Astronomy			Sanskrit	Achyutha Pisharadi	1580 CE	Kerala
Uparāgaviṃśati	Astronomy	Manual on the computation of eclipses		Sanskrit	Achyutha Pisharadi	1580 CE	Kerala
Rāśigolasphuṭānīti	Astronomy	Reduction of the moon's true longitude in its own orbit t		Sanskrit	Achyutha Pisharadi	1580 CE	Kerala
Veṇvārohavyākhyā		Commentary on the Veṇvāroha of Mādhava		Sanskrit	Achyutha Pisharadi	1580 CE	
Tulsidas Ramayan (Ramcharitmanas)	Hinduism	Translation of Ramayana into Awadhi		Awadhi	Tulsidas		
Baharistan-i-Ghaibi	History	chronicle on the history of Bengal, Cooch Behar, Assam and Bihar	Jatakalankara	Astrology		1613 CE	
Nirṇayāmṛta	Religious			Sanskrit	Allāḍanātha	14th-16th century	Yamuna valley
Dayabhagatippani	Legal			Sanskrit	Srinath Acharyachudamani	16th Century	
Dayabhagatika	Legal			Sanskrit	Raghunandan Bhattacharya	16th Century	Bengal
Praśastapādabhāṣya					Laugākṣi Bhāskara	17th Century	
Tarkasangraha	Logic and Reasoning				Annam Bhatta	17th Century	
Tarkakaumudi	Logic and Reasoning				Laugākṣi Bhāskara	17th Century	
Arthasangrahah					Laugākṣi Bhāskara	17th Century	
Chahar Gulshan	History	History of India		Persian	Rai Chatar Man Kayath	1759 CE	
Sadratnamala	Astronomy and Mathematics	Traditional Vedic Mathematics		Sanskrit	Sankara Varman	1819 CE	Malabar (Kerala)

== See also ==
- Indian literature
- Timeline of Hindu texts
- Sanskrit Buddhist literature
- Sanskrit literature
- Sanskrit revival
- List of Sanskrit universities in India
- List of Sanskrit academic institutes outside India
- List of Sanskrit poets
- Symbolic usage of Sanskrit
- Sanskrit Wikipedia
