= List of astronomers and mathematicians of the Kerala school =

This is a list of astronomers and mathematicians of the Kerala school. The region surrounding the south-west coast of the Indian subcontinent, now politically organised as the Kerala State in India, has a long tradition of studies and investigations in all areas related to the branch of śāstra known as jyotiṣa. This branch of śāstra, in its broadest sense, incorporates several subdisciplines like mathematics, astronomy, astrology, horary astrology, etc. In Indian traditional jyotiṣa scholarship, there are no clear cut boundary lines separating these subdisciplines. Hence the list presented below includes all who would be called a jyotiṣa-scholar in the Indian traditional sense. All these persons will be, most likely, well versed in the subdisciplines of mathematics and astronomy as well. The list is an adaptation of the list of mathematicians and astronomers compiled by K. V. Sarma. Sarma has referred to all of them as astronomers. K. V. Sarma (1919–2005) was an Indian historian of science, particularly the astronomy and mathematics of the Kerala school. He was responsible for bringing to light several of the achievements of the Kerala school. He was editor of the Vishveshvaranand Indological Research Series, and published the critical edition of several source works in Sanskrit, including the Aryabhatiya of Aryabhata. He was recognised as "the greatest authority on Kerala's astronomical tradition". Additional information about the persons mentioned in the list are available in books on the history of Malayalam literature and on the history of Sanskrit literature in Kerala.

== List astronomers and mathematicians of the Kerala school ==
Serial number	Name	Period	Works	Known for	Remarks
1	Vararuci I	4th century CE		Vararuci vākyas; introduction of Kaṭapayādi system for expressing numbers; father figure in the legend of Parayi petta panthirukulam	
2	Vararuci II		Kerala-dvādasa-bhāva-vākyani, Vārarucika, Jātakarahasya		Might be identical with Vararuci I. Apart from the works of Vararuci I cited above, there are several works in Sanskrit all attributed to Vararuci. David Pingree in his Census of Exact Sciences in Saskrit has cited as many as eleven such works.
3	Haridatta	c.650-700	Grahacāraṇinibandhana, Mahā-mārganibabndhana (NA)	Promulgation of parahita system in 683.	
3a	Devācārya	c. 689	Karaṇaratna	Recognition of the precession of the equinoxes at the rate of 47 seconds per annum (modern value 50 seconds per annum)	
4	Govindasvāmin	c. 800 - 850	Mahābhāskarīya Bhāshya, Govindakṛiti (NA); Govindapaddhati (NA)		Court astronomer of King Ravi Varma Kerala; teacher of Śaṅkaranārāyaṇa
5	Śaṅkaranārāyaṇa	825 - 900	Laghubhāskarīya	References to the presence of an astronomical observatory at Mahodayapuram (modern day Kodungallur).	Student of Govindasvāmin
6	Udayadivākara	11th century	A commentary called Sundari on Laghubhāskarīya		Commented on a work of Jayadeva
7	Acyuta I		Devakerala (also known as Keralajyotisṣa)		
8	Keralācarya	12th century	Kerala-saṁhitā, Keralīyapraśnamārga		
9	Vyāghrapāda		Aṅkaṇasāstra		A devotee of Lord Siva enshrined at Vaikom Temple in Central Kerala.
10	Kṛṣṇa	c. 1200	Cintājñāna		
Serial number	Name	Period	Works	Known for	Remarks
11	Kṛṣṇa-śiṣya	c. 1200	Commentary on Hora; Prśnaphalaprāptkālanirṇaya		A disciple of Kṛṣṇa
12	Suryadeva Yajvan	1191 - c. 1250	Commentaries on Āryabhaṭa's Āryabhaṭīya, Manjula's Laghumānasa, Śrīpati's Jātaka-paddhati, Govindasvami's bhāṣya on Bhāskara I's Mahābhāskarīya		
13	Vidyāmādhava		Muhūrtadarśana		A member of the Tulu Brahmin family of Nīlamana; six commentaries on Muhūrtadarśana have been identified.
14	Viṣṇu (of Nīlamana)		A commentary on Muhūrtadarśana		Son of Vidyāmādhava
15	Govinda Bhaṭṭatiri (of Talakkuḷam)	1237 - 1295	Dasādhyāyi, Muhūrtaratna, Muhūrtapadavi	Progenitor of the Pazhūr Kaniyār family of astrologers	Belongs to Alathiyur (Malappuram) village.
16	Tāmaranallūr	14th century	Muhūrtavidhi (Tāmaranallūr Bhāāṣā)		The work uses a mixture of Malayalam and Sanskrit languages.
17	Nityaprakāśa Yati	14th - 15th century	Commentaries on Hora, both in Malayalam and Sanskrit		
18	Kumāra Gaṇaka	14th - 15th century	Raṇadīpikā		
19	Rudra I	c. 1325 - 1400			Teacher of Parameśvara
20	Mādhava of Saṅgamagrāma	c. 1340 - 1425	Golavada, Madhyamanayanaprakara, Venvaroha, Chandravakyani	Discoverer of the infinite series expansions for sin x and cos x	Greatest mathematician-astronomer of the Kerala School
Serial number	Name	Period	Works	Known for	Remarks
21	Parameśvara of Vațaśśeri (Parameśvara I)	c. 1360 - 1455	Drigganita (1430), Bhatadipika – Commentary on Āryabhaṭīya of Āryabhaṭa I, Karmadipika – Commentary on Mahabhaskariya of Bhaskara I, Paramesvari – Commentary on Laghubhaskariya of Bhaskara I, Sidhantadipika – Commentary on Mahabhaskariyabhashya of Govindasvāmi, Vivarana – Commentary on Surya Siddhanta and Lilāvati, Goladipika – Spherical geometry and astronomy (composed in 1443 CE), Grahanamandana – Computation of eclipses (Its epoch is 15 July 1411 CE.), Grahanavyakhyadipika – On the rationale of the theory of eclipses, Vakyakarana – Methods for the derivation of several astronomical tables	Promulgator of the Drigganita system.	A proponent of observational astronomy in medieval India who had made a series of eclipse observations to verify the accuracy of the computational methods then in use
22	Dāmodara of Vațaśreņi (Dāmodara I)	c. 1410 - 1510		Teacher of Nilakantha Somayaji	Son of Parameśvara of Vațaśśeri
23	Ravi Nampūtiri	c. 1425 - 1500	Ācāradīpika' (a commentary on Muhūrtadīpika)		
24	Nīlakaņțha Sōmayāji	1444 - 1545	Tantrasamgraha, Golasara (Description of basic astronomical elements and procedures), Sidhhantadarpana, Candrachayaganita, Aryabhatiya-bhashya (Elaborate commentary on Aryabhatiya), Sidhhantadarpana-vyakhya, Chandrachhayaganita-vyakhya, Sundaraja-prasnottara, Grahanadi-grantha, Grahapariksakrama	Tantrasamgraha (A comprehensive treatise on astronomy)	
25	Śankara of Keļallūr	c. 1475 - 1575			Nīlakaņțha Sōmayāji's younger brother. The person entrusted with task of popularizing Aryabhatiya-bhashya of Nīlakaņțha Sōmayāji.
26	Citrabhānu	c. 1475 - 1550	Karaṇāmṛta (a manual on astronomical computations)		Pupil of Nīlakaņțha Sōmayāji
27	Citrabhānu Śiṣya	c. 1500 - 1575	Bhācintāvali (a work on astrology)		
28	Mazhamaṅgalaṃ Nārāyaṇan Naṃpūtiri (Nārāyaṇa I)	c. 1540-1610	Laghuvivṛti on Pañcabodha IV, Uparāgakriyākrama (eclipse computations), two commentaries on Līlavati, one short and the other five times longer than the short, both called Kriyākramakarī and Karmadīpikā		Son of Śaṅkara of Mahiṣamaṅgalam : Śaṅkara III
29	Śankara Vāriyar	c. 1500 - 1560	Laghuvivṛti (commentary on Tantrasamgraha)		Disciple of Nīlakaņțha Sōmayāji and protege of Āzhvāñceri Taṃprakkaḷ
30	Jyeṣṭhadeva	c. 1500 - 1610	Yuktibhāṣā (in Malayalam), Gaṣitayuktibhaṣa (in Sanskrit), Dṛkkaraṇa (in Malayalam)	Yuktibhāṣā	The name is probably the Sanskritised form of his personal name in the local Malayalam language. Pupil of Teacher of Dāmodara of Vațaśreņi and teacher of Acyuta Piṣāraṭi.
Serial number	Name	Period	Works	Known for	Remarks
31	Jyeṣṭhadeva-Śiṣya	c. 1550 - 1625	A metrical commentary on Tantrasamgraha		Disciple of Jyeṣṭhadeva
32	Māttūr Naṃpūtiri-s: Puruṣottama I and Subrahmaṇya I	c. 1475 - 1550	Muhūrtapadvī (a condensed work in about 40 verses dealing with the prescriptions of auspicious times for functions)	The book is highly popular as attested by the availability of several commentaries on it.	Lived in Pāññāḷ village in Thrissur district
33	Nārāyaṇa of Kaṇvavastu: Nārāyaṇa II	15th century	Muhūrtadīpika (A comprehensive treatise in about 400 verses on the auspicious times for functions)		
34	Rudra Vāariyar: Rudra II	c. 1475 - 1550	Commentary on Varāhamihira's Hora, called Nauka or Vivarana, and Aṣṭamaṅgalapraśna		Belongs to Deśamaṅgalaṃ Vāriyaṃ
35	Śaṅkara of Mahiṣamaṅgalam : Śaṅkara III	1494 - 1570	Gaṅitasāra, Candragaṅitakramaand Ayanacalanādi-gaṅita (all books on astronomy); Jatakakrama, Jātakasāra and Praśnamāla (books on astrology). All these are composed in simple Malayalam poetry or prose. His works on Sanskrit include Jātakasāra, commentaries on Pañcabodha and Laghubhāskarīya.	Popularization of astronomical works among the masses in Kerala.	Hails from Peruvanam village near Thrissur. Spent most of his life with his teacher Parameśvaran Poṭṭi of Vāzha-māveli house in Chengannur.
36	Madhava of Iñcakkāzhvā : Mādhava II	c. 1500 - 1575	Praśnasāra (incorporates several local practices)		Hails from Ramamangalam near Muvvattupuzha
37	Acyuta Piṣāraṭi : Acyuta II	c. 1550 - 1621	Spuṭanirṇaya, Raśigoḷaspuṭānīti, Karaṇottama (astronomical computation), Uparagakriyākrama (eclipse computations), Chāyāṣṭaka (shadow computations); commentaries on Veṅvāroha and Sūryasidhanta	Enunciation, for the first time in Indian astronomy, of the correction called "Reduction to the ecliptic". This was introduced in Western astronomy by Tycho Brahe at about the same time.	Teacher of the poet and grammarian Melpattūr Narāyaṇa Bhaṭṭa
38	Nīlakaṇṭha II	16th - 17th centuries	Kanakkusāraṃ couched in maṇipravāḷaṃ style which is a mixture of Malayalam and Sanskrit languages. The work deals also with practices relating to grain transactions, house building, weighing og gold and silver, land tenure, masonry, ground measurement, etc.		
39	Nārāyaṇa III	date completely unknown	Laghudarśini (a short work on astrology)		
40	Dāmodara of Maṅgalaśreṇi (Dāmodara II)	c. 1575 - 1675	Praśnarīti, Līlāvati-vyākhyā		Hails from Kaṇṇāṭipparampu in Chirakkal taluk in North Malabar
Serial number	Name	Period	Works	Known for	Remarks
41	Iṭakramañceri Nampūtiri	c. 1625 - 1700	Bhadradīpa-gaṇita (composed in maṇipravāḷaṃ style)		Pupil of Dāmodara of Maṅgalaśreṇi
42	Maṅgalaśreṇivipra-Śiṣya	17th century	Jyotiṣasaṃgraha (in Malayalam)		
43	Pāṇkkāṭṭu (or, Iṭakkāṭṭu) Namputiri	c. 1625 - 1725	Praśnamārga		Praśnamārga is the most popular and authoritative work on praśna in Kerala.
44	Iṭakkāṭṭu (or Eṭakkāṭṭu) Kukkuṇiyāḷ	c. 1675 0 1750	Praśnarīti		Pupil of Pāṇkkāṭṭu Namputiri
45	Rāma-śiṣya	17th century	An explanatory rendering in Malayalam verses of the Laghuhorā of Varāahamihira		
46	Puruṣottama II	c. 1650 - 1725	Uparāgapariccheda (computation of solar and lunar eclipses)		
47	Putumana Somayāji	c. 1660 - 1740	Karaṇapaddhati (comprehensive text on astronomical computations), Nyāyaratna, Veṇvārohāṣtaka, Mānasagaṇitam, Jātakādeś	Authorship of Karaṇapaddhati	A member of the Putuvana family of Śivapuram (Thissur). Karaṇapaddhati has been commented in Sanskrit, Malayalam and Tamil. It manuscripts are available in Tamil and Telugu scripts also.
48	Vāsudevasvami : Vāsudeva I		Kāaladīpa (treatise on natural astrology)		The manuscrpt of the book was procured from Punnattūrkoṭṭa Mana, Koṭṭappaṭi, North Malabar
49	Śyāmaḷavaāraṇa Rāja		Commentary on Kāaladīpa of Vāsudevasvami		Member of Punnattūrkoṭṭa Mana
50	Dāmodara of Bharadvāja Gotra : Dāmodara III		Muhūrtābharaṇa (treatise on auspicious times for functions)		Hails from Tṛpparaṛṛoṭ village in Malabar
Serial number	Name	Period	Works	Known for	Remarks
51	Kṛṣṇa II		Commentary on Āryabhaṭīya in Malayalam		
52	Keralīya-dvija		Malayalam commentary on Karaṇottama of Acyuta Piṣāraṭi		
53	Govinda-śiṣya		Commentary called Bālaprabodhini on Jatakapaddhati of Parameśvara of Vaṭaśśeṇi		Hails from Vaikkam
54	Veṇād Brāhmaṇa		Jātakodaya (work on astrology in 103 verses)		
55	Azhvāñceri Taṃprākkaḷ	c. 1725 - 1800	Eleven books in the form of adapted texts and commentaries covering the entire field of astronomy and astrology. Jyotiśśāstra-saṃgraha, Saṃgraha-sādhana-kṛiyā, Jātaka-sāara-saṃgraha, Jātakānīti-mārga, Phalasāra-samuccaya, etc.	Efforts to propagate interest in studies on Jyotiṣa among members of the Nampūtiri community	Personal name unknown
56	Vāsudeva of Vaḷḷimana : Vāsudeva II		A metrical commentary on Muhūrtapadavi		Hails from Kaṇṇamaṅgalaṃ
57	Tuppan Nampūtiri of Iṭavaṭṭkkāt	c. 1725 - 1800	Muhūrtapadavi VI		Hails from Pāakoḍe in Kunnathunad
58	Nārāyaṇa of Iṭavaṭṭkkāt : Nārāyaṇa IV	c. 1728 - 1800	Muhūrtapadavi VII		Younger brother of Tuppan Nampūtiri of Iṭavaṭṭkkāt
59	Parameśvara II		Commentaries called Pārameśvarī on Varāahamihira's Horā		
60	Parameśvara, pupil of Śankara : Parameśvara III		Commentaries called Jātakacandrikā on Varāahamihira's Horā		
Serial number	Name	Period	Works	Known for	Remarks
61	Bhaāradvāja-dvija	c, 1750 - 1800	Gaṇitayuktayah (rationales of mathematical and astronomical procedures), Karaṇadarpaṇa (advanced manual on astronomical computations)		
62	Nārāyaṇa of Peruvanaṃ (Nārāyaṇa V)		Tantrasāra		
63	Kṛṣṇadāsa (Koccukṛṣṇan Āāśan)	1756 - 1812	Pañcabodha VIII (Malayalam verse), Bhāṣājātakapaddhati (Malayalam commentary on Jātakapaddhati of Parameśvara of Vaṭaśśeṇi, Kaṇkkuśāstram (mathematical procedures in Malayalam verse)		Born in the family of Neṭumpayil in Tiruvalla taluk.
64	Śankara of Muktisthala : Śankara IV	17th century	Mantrasāra, Sāmudrasāra, Ārūḍha-praśna, Lāñchana-śāstra (omens, palmistrym, astrological omens, etc.), Āyurpraśna (dealing with life longevity, Aṣṭamaṅgala, etc.)		Hails from Mukkola
65	Śaṅkara V		Jātakasāra (III), Praśnasāra (I) (both in Malayalam verse)		
66	Bhutanāthapura-Somayāji		Praśnasāra (III)		
67	Śrīkumāra, son of Nīlakaṇṭha		Praśnāmṛta		
68	Nārāyaṇan Iḷayatu of Maccāṭ : Nārāyaṇa VI	1765 - 1843	Jyotiṣa-Bhāṣāvalī, Jātakādeśaratna		Patronised by Śaktan Tampurān
69	Parameśvara of Puradahanapura : Parameśvara IV	c. 1775 - 1839	Commentary called Varadīpikā on Muhūrtapadavi II of Māttūr Puruṣottama Naṃpūtiri		Member of Puradahanapura (Purayannur) family in Vaḷḷuvanāṭ
70	Śrīkaṇṭha Vāriyar of Veḷḷrakkaād		Commentary in Malayalam on Jātakapaddhati of Parameśara of Vaṭaśreṇi		The commentary is available in print.
Serial number	Name	Period	Works	Known for	Remarks
71	Ghaṭigopa	c. 1800 - 1860	Two commentaries on Āryabhaṭīya, one in Malayalam and the other in Sanskrit		A devotee of God Padmanabha, the presiding deity of Thiruvananthapuram
72	Goda Varma, Vidvān Iḷaya Tampurān	1800 - 1851	Commentaries in Sanskrit on Gaṇitādhyāya of Bhāskarīya-gaṇita and the Goladhyāya of Siddhāntaśiromaṇi		Member of the royal family of Kodungallur
73	Śaṅkara Varma of Kaṭattanāṭ	1800 - 1838	Sadratnamālā	The computation of the value of the mathematical constant $\pi$ correct to 17 decimal places	
74	Subrahmaṇya Śāstri	1829 - 1888	Agaṇita (procedures for computing the positions of planets for a thousand years		Hails from Nalleppalli in Chittur-Cochin
75	Subrahmaṇya of Kunnattu Mana : Subrahmaṇya II	c. 1850 - 1900	Commentary called Bhāvaprakāśika on the Muhūrtadarśana of Vidyāmādhava		Also known as Subrahmaṇyan Tirumunpu of Kunnattu Mana of Payyanur in North Malabar
76	Puruṣottaman Mūssatu : Puruṣottama III	c. 1850 - 1900	Praśnāyana (a comprehensive work in 1018 verses)		
77	Rāma Varma Koyittampurān	1853 - 1910	Jyotiṣapradīpa		
78	Rāma Vāriyar of Kaikkuḷaṅra	1833 - 1897	Sāmudrikaśāstra, Gauḷiśāstra, commentaries on Horā and Praśnamārga		
79	A. R. Rajaraja Varma Koyittampurān	1853 - 1918	Karaṇapariṣkaraṇa, Pañcāṅgaśuddhipaddhati, Jyotiṣaprakāśna		
80	Vāsuṇṇi Mūsstu of Veḷḷānaśśeri	1855 - 1914	Commentary in Malayalam on Pañchabodha		
Serial number	Name	Period	Works	Known for	Remarks
81	Punnaśśeri Nampi Nīlakaṇṭha Śarma	1858 - 1935	Jyotiśāstrasubodhini, Pañcabodhakriyā-Bhāṣa		Works published by Bharata Vilasam Press, Thrissur
82	P. S. Purushottaman Namputiri	1889-?	Gaṇitanirṇaya (Sanskrit with Malayalamý exposition) (Thrissur, 1940's) and several books on astrology in Malayalam including Jyothisa Sarasagraham, Varāhamihra's Bṛhat Samhitā, Brahat Jathaka Padhathi , Prasnanusthana Padhathi, Madhaveeyam, etc.		
83	K. V. A. Rama Poduval	(1881-1959)	Gaṇitaprakāśikā (Sanskrit with Malayalam exposition) (Kannur, 1950)		Hailed from Payyannur, Kerala
84	V. P. Kunhikkanna Poduval		Śuddhadṛggaṇita (Sanskrit with Malayalamý exposition) (Kozhikode, 1956)		

== See also ==
- A History of the Kerala School of Hindu Astronomy (book by K. V. Sarma)
- Kerala school of astronomy and mathematics
