= Devācārya =

Indian astronomer

Devācārya was an Indian astronomer hailing from Kerala, India who flourished during the second half of 7th century CE. He is the author of a karaņa text on astronomy titled Karaņaratna which deals with almost every aspect of planetary astronomy generally discussed in other Indian texts on astronomy. This work is important in the study of history of astronomy in India as it sheds valuable light on the methods used by the astronomers of South India, in the seventh century CE, in their astronomical computations. No personal information about Devācārya is known except that his father's name was Gojanma and that Devācārya was a great devotee of Viṣṇu, Ŝiva and Brahma. That he flourished during the second half of the seventh century CE is inferred from the fact the epoch (the date from which the planetary computations are to be commenced) specified in Karaņaratna is the first day of the year 611 Saka Era which corresponds to 26 February 689 CE.

== A noteworthy contribution ==
There is one significant point that needs special mention: Devācārya is the first astronomer to give a rule for finding the precession of equinoxes. He has based his rule on the assumption that the precession of the equinoxes is oscillatory and its rate is about 47 seconds per annum. The modern value of the rate is 50.3 seconds per annum. The rule appears in stanza 36 Chapter 1 of Karaṇaratna.

== Devācārya, a Kerala astronomer ==
There are several evidences which conclusively establish that Devācārya hailed from Kerala, India:

- All the available manuscripts of Karaņaratna were discovered from Kerala and they are all written in the Malayalam script.
- Devācārya uses the kaṭapayādi scheme for representing numbers which is the signature method of Kerala astronomers for representing numbers.
- Devācārya uses the Śākābda Samskāra, a correction applied to the mean longitudes of the planets, from 444 Saka Era or 521 CE.
- The method used for the computation of solar eclipses is a unique method peculiar to Kerala.
- Quotations from Karaņaratna appear in the works of later astronomers and mathematicians of the Kerala school of astronomy and mathematics, namely, Paramesvara and Nīlakaṇṭha Somayājī.

Devācārya can be described as an astronomer who was a follower of Āryabhaṭa I' school of astronomy. At the same time he had no hesitation in adopting and adapting concepts from Brahmagupta's Khaṇḍakhādyaka and Sūryasiddhānta.

== Contents of Karaṇaratna ==
Karaṇaratna, in eight chapters, covers all the topics related to astronomy that are generally discussed in other Indian texts on astronomy. In the first chapter, the author discusses the computation of the true positions of the Sun and the Moon and the elements of Pañjaṅga, the second and third chapters respectively deal with lunar and solar eclipses and the fourth chapter with gnomonic shadow. The remaining four chapters are devoted to discussions on time of moonrise, visibilty of the Moon, positions of planets and planetary conjunctions.

== Full text of Devācārya's work ==
- Full text of Karaņaratna edited with an English translation by K. S. Shukla is available in the Internet Archive at the link HERE.

== See also ==
List of astronomers and mathematicians of the Kerala school
