= Sankara Variar =

Indian astronomer-mathematician (1500–1560)

Sankara Variyar (IAST: Śaṅkara Vāriyar; c. 1500 – c. 1560) was an astronomer-mathematician of the Kerala school of astronomy and mathematics. His family were employed as temple-assistants in the temple at Tṛkkuṭaveli near modern Ottapalam.

== Mathematical lineage ==
He was taught mainly by Nilakantha Somayaji (1444–1544), the author of the Tantrasamgraha and Jyesthadeva (1500–1575), the author of Yuktibhāṣā. Other teachers of Shankara include Netranarayana, the patron of Nilakantha Somayaji and Chitrabhanu, the author of an astronomical treaties dated to 1530 and a small work with solutions and proofs for algebraic equations.

== Works ==
The known works of Shankara Variyar are the following:

- Yukti-dipika - an extensive commentary in verse on Tantrasamgraha based on Yuktibhāṣā.
- Laghu-vivrti - a short commentary in prose on Tantrasamgraha.
- Kriya-kramakari - a lengthy prose commentary on Lilavati of Bhaskara II.
- An astronomical commentary dated 1529 CE.
- An astronomical handbook completed around 1554 CE.

== See also ==
- List of astronomers and mathematicians of the Kerala school
