= Puthumana Somayaji =

Indian mathematician (1660–1740)

Puthumana Somayaji (c.1660–1740) was a 17th-century astronomer-mathematician from Kerala, India. He was born into the Puthumana or Puthuvana (in Sanskrit, Nutanagriha or Nuthanvipina) family of Sivapuram (identified as present day Thrissur). The most famous work attributed to Puthumana Somayaji is Karanapaddhati which is a comprehensive treatise on Astronomy.

== Period of Somayaji ==
The period in which Somayaji lived is uncertain. There are several theories in this regard.

- C.M. Whish, the first westerner to write about Karanapaddhati, based on his interpretation that certain words appearing in the final verse of Karanapaddhati denote in katapayadi system the number of days in the Kali Yuga, concluded that the book was completed in 1733 CE. Whish had also claimed that the grandson of the author of the Karanapaddhati was alive and was in his seventieth year at the time of writing his paper.
- Based on reference to Puthumana Somayaji in a verse in Ganita Sucika Grantha by Govindabhatta, Raja Raja Varma placed the author of Karanapaddhati between 1375 and 1475 CE.
- An internal study of Karanapaddhati suggests that the work is contemporaneous with or even antedates the Tantrasangraha of Nilakantha Somayaji (1465–1545 CE).
- The date of composition of Karanapaddhati is given in the concluding verse by a chronogram which can be translated as 1732 CE. K. V. Sarma has argued for accepting this date as the most probable date of composition of Karanapaddhati.

== Other works by Somayaji ==
- Nyaaya Rathnam, an 8-chapter Ganitha Grantham
- Jaathakaadesa Maargam
- Smaartha-Praayaschitham
- Venvaarohaashtakam
- Pañcabodha
- Grahanaashtakam
- Grahana Ganitham

== See also ==
- Indian Mathematics
- Indian Astronomy
- List of astronomers and mathematicians of the Kerala school
