= Jyotirmimamsa =

Astronomical treatise (c. 1504) by Nilakantha Somayaji

In astronomy, Jyotirmimamsa (analysis of astronomy) is a treatise on the methodology of astronomical studies authored by Nilakantha Somayaji (1444–1544) in around 1504 CE. Nilakantha somayaji was an important astronomer-mathematician of the Kerala school of astronomy and mathematics and was the author of the much celebrated astronomical work titled Tantrasamgraha. This book stresses the necessity and importance of astronomical observations to obtain correct parameters for computations and to develop more and more accurate theories. It even discounts the role of revealed wisdom and divine intuitions in studying astronomical phenomena. Jyotirmimamsa is sometimes cited as proof to establish that modern methodologies of scientific investigations were known to ancient and medieval Indians. Neelkantha Somayaji insisted that computational results should tally with that of observations and astronomical parameters and constants should be revised periodically. To come to more precise conclusions, Neelkantha Somayaji have discussions with the astronomer and mathematicians of other schools.

The nature of the astronomical and mathematical work, the divine intuition, the experimental details of the science, corrections to the planetary parameters, reasons for the corrections for the planetary revolutions, Vedic authority for inference in astronomy, relative accuracy of different systems, and correction through eclipses, true motion, position, etc., of planets are some of the topics discussed in Jyotirmimamsa.

== Synopsis ==
The following is an outline of the various topics discussed in Jyotirmimamsa.

- The necessity of revising the astronomical constants at regular intervals for correcting the parameters connected with astronomy
- The meaning of devatha prasada, which is manifested in the intuition of the astronomers, as a prerequisite for obtaining the accurate values and the correct approach in the astronomy
- The experimental determinations of the astronomical constants and the tools used for these determinations
- The need and the importance of conducting experiments in astronomical studies
- Significance of the astronomical books and the base of collecting data from those books
- Application of corrections, called bija correction, for the astronomical figures
- The corrections known as the Bhatta correction
- Justification of the changes made by the astronomer Lallacharya in his book Sishyaddhi vruddhi tantra
- Reasons for difference in the mean planets though the revolutions are identical
- Vedic authority for inference as a means to derive the number of planetary revolutions
- Different systems of astronomy
- The numbers of planetary revolutions enunciated by Sripati and Brahmagupta
- The numbers of revolutions of planets, apogees and nodes, number of days, in a Kalpa (in astronomy, a period of 14×72×4320000 years)
- Zero points of the planets at the commencement of Kali Yuga, corrections to planetary revolutions
- Relative accuracy of the different astronomical systems
- Mean planets according to the Sunrise system of Aryabhatiya, mean planets, Moon's apogee and Moon's node according to Siddhantasekhara
- Application of the values in the astronomical calculations, astronomical corrections given on the bases of the eclipses
- Eclipses observed by Parameswaracharya
- Method of corrections given by other astronomers
- Demonstration of the validity of those corrections through eclipses, precision of equinoxes, calculation and the correction, correction of the periphery of the manda epicycle, discussion on the precision of the equinoxes, corrections due to the precession of the equinoxes
- Sine table for praanakalaantara, sine table for the ascensional differences
- Derivation of the 36 Rsines
- Graphic proof for the relation of the sides and hypotenuse
- Reason for the reduction of the minutes of arc of the planetary orbital to the visible celestial sphere

== See also ==
- Indian astronomy
- Indian mathematics
- Indian mathematicians
- History of mathematics
