= Tantrasamgraha =

Astronomical treatise written by Nilakantha Somayaji

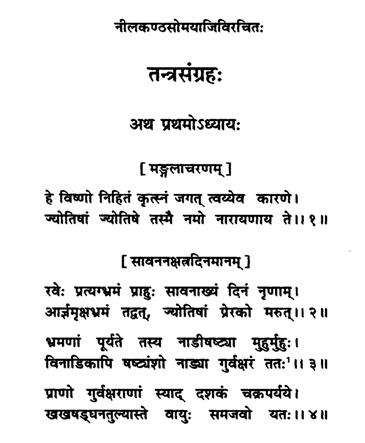
- Opening verses of Tantrasamgraha (in Devanagari)
- Author: Nilakantha Somayaji
- Language: Sanskrit
- Subject: Astronomy/Mathematics
- Publication date: 1500-01 CE
- Publication place: India

Tantrasamgraha, or Tantrasangraha, (literally, A Compilation of the System) is an astronomical treatise written by Nilakantha Somayaji, an astronomer/mathematician belonging to the Kerala school of astronomy and mathematics. The treatise was completed in 1501 CE. It consists of 432 verses in Sanskrit divided into eight chapters. Tantrasamgraha had spawned a few commentaries: Tantrasamgraha-vyakhya of anonymous authorship and Yuktibhāṣā authored by Jyeshtadeva in about 1550 CE. Tantrasangraha, together with its commentaries, bring forth the depths of the mathematical accomplishments the Kerala school of astronomy and mathematics, in particular the achievements of the remarkable mathematician of the school Sangamagrama Madhava. In his Tantrasangraha, Nilakantha revised Aryabhata's model for the planets Mercury and Venus. According to George G Joseph his equation of the centre for these planets remained the most accurate until the time of Johannes Kepler in the 17th century.

It was C.M. Whish, a civil servant of East India Company, who brought to the attention of the western scholarship the existence of Tantrasamgraha through a paper published in 1835. The other books mentioned by C.M. Whish in his paper were Yuktibhāṣā of Jyeshtadeva, Karanapaddhati of Puthumana Somayaji and Sadratnamala of Sankara Varman.

== Author and date of Tantrasamgraha ==
Nilakantha Somayaji, the author of Tantrasamgraha, was a Nambudiri belonging to the Gargya gotra and a resident of Trikkantiyur, near Tirur in central Kerala. The name of his Illam was Kelallur. He studied under Damodara, son of Paramesvara. The first and the last verses in Tantrasamgraha contain chronograms specifying the dates, in the form Kali days, of the commencement and of the completion of book. These work out to dates in 1500–01.

== Synopsis of the book ==
A brief account of the contents of Tantrasamgraha is presented below.A descriptive account of the contents is available in Bharatheeya Vijnana/Sastra Dhara. Full details of the contents are available in an edition of Tantrasamgraha published in the Indian Journal of History of Science.

- Chapter 1 (Madhyama-prakaranam): The purpose of the astronomical computation, civil and sidereal day measurements, lunar month, solar month, intercalary month, revolutions of the planets, theory of intercalation, planetary revolution in circular orbits, computation of kali days, mathematical operations like addition, subtraction, multiplication, division, squaring and determining square root, fractions, positive and negative numbers, computation of mean planets, correction for longitude, longitudinal time, positions of the planets at the beginning of Kali era, planetary apogees in degrees. (40 slokas)
- Chapter 2 (Sphuta-prakaranam (On true planets)): Computation of risings, and arcs, construction of a circle of diameter equal to the side of a given square, computation of the circumference without the use of square and roots, sum of series, sum of the series of natural numbers, of squares of numbers, of cubes of numbers, processes relating to Rsines and arcs, computation of the arc of a given Rsine, computation of the circumference of a circle, derivation of Rsines for given Rversed sine and arc, computation of Rsine and arcs, accurate computation of the 24 ordained Rsines, sectional Rsines and Rsine differences, sum of Rsine differences, summation of Rsine differences, computation of the arc of an Rsine according to Madhava, computation of Rsine and Rversed sine at desired point without the aid of the ordained Rsines, rules relating to triangles, rules relating to cyclic quadrilaterals, rules relating to the hypotenuse of a quadrilateral, computation of the diameter from the area of the cyclic quadrilateral, surface area of a sphere, computation of the desired Rsine, the ascensional difference, sun's daily motion in minutes of arc, application of ascensional difference to true planets, measure of day and night on applying ascensional difference, conversion of the arc of Rsine of the ascensional difference, etc. (59 slokas)
- Chapter 3 (Chhaya-prakaranam (Treatise on shadow)): Deals with various problems related with the sun's position on the celestial sphere, including the relationships of its expressions in the three systems of coordinates, namely ecliptic, equatorial and horizontal coordinates. (116 slokas)
- Chapter 4 (Chandragrahana-prakaranam (Treatise on the lunar eclipse)): Diameter of the Earth's shadow in minutes, Moon's latitude and Moon's rate of motion, probability of an eclipse, total eclipse and rationale of the explanation given for total eclipse, half duration and first and last contacts, points of contacts and points of release in eclipse, and their method of calculation, visibility of the contact in the eclipse at sunrise and sunset, contingency of the invisibility of an eclipse, possibility of the deflection, deflection due to latitude and that due to declination. (53 slokas)
- Chapter 5 (Ravigrahana-prakaranam (Treatise on the solar eclipse)): Possibility of a solar eclipse, minutes of parallax in latitude of the sun, minutes of parallax in latitude of the moon,. maximum measure of the eclipse, middle of the eclipse, time of first contact and last contact, half duration and times of submergence and emergence, reduction to observation of computed eclipse, mid eclipse, non prediction of an eclipse. (63 slokas)
- Chapter 6 (Vyatipata-prakaranam (On vyatipata)): Deals with the complete deviation of the longitudes of the sun and the moon. (24 slokas)
- Chapter 7 (Drikkarma-prakaranam (On visibility computation)): Discusses the rising and setting of the moon and planets. (15 slokas)
- Chapter 8 (Sringonnati-prakaranam (On elevation of the lunar cusps)): Examines the size of the part of the moon which is illuminated by the sun and gives a graphical representation of it. (40 slokas)

== Some noteworthy features of Tantrasamgraha ==
"A remarkable synthesis of Indian spherical astronomical knowledge occurs in a passage in Tantrasamgraha." In astronomy, the spherical triangle formed by the zenith, the celestial north pole and the Sun is called the astronomical triangle. Its sides and two of its angles are important astronomical quantities. The sides are 90° – φ where φ is the observer's terrestrial latitude, 90° – δ where δ is the Sun's declination and 90° – a where a is the Sun's altitude above the horizon. The important angles are the angle at the zenith which is the Sun's azimuth and the angle at the north pole which is the Sun's hour angle. The problem is to compute two of these elements when the other three elements are specified. There are precisely ten different possibilities and Tantrasamgraha contains discussions of all these possibilities with complete solutions one by one in one place. "The spherical triangle is handled as systematically here as in any modern textbook."

The terrestrial latitude of an observer's position is equal to the zenith distance of the Sun at noon on the equinoctial day. The effect of solar parallax on zenith distance was known to Indian astronomers right from Aryabhata. But it was Nilakantha Somayaji who first discussed the effect of solar parallax on the observer's latitude. Tantrasamgraha gives the magnitude of this correction and also a correction due to the finite size of the Sun.

In his Aryabhatiyabhasya, a commentary on Aryabhata's Aryabhatiya, Nilakantha developed a computational system for a partially heliocentric planetary model in which Mercury, Venus, Mars, Jupiter and Saturn orbit the Sun, which in turn orbits the Earth, similar to the Tychonic system later proposed by Tycho Brahe in the late 16th century. Most astronomers of the Kerala school who followed him accepted this planetary model.

== Conference on 500 years of Tantrasamgraha ==
A Conference to celebrate the 500th Anniversary of Tantrasangraha was organised by the Department of Theoretical Physics, University of Madras, in collaboration with the Inter-University Centre of the Indian Institute of Advanced Study, Shimla, during 11–13 March 2000, at Chennai. The Conference turned out to be an important occasion for highlighting and reviewing the recent work on the achievements in Mathematics and Astronomy of the Kerala school and the new perspectives in History of Science, which are emerging from these studies. A compilation of the important papers presented at this Conference has also been published.

== Other works of the same author ==
The following is a brief description of the other works by Nilakantha Somayaji.

- Jyotirmimamsa
- Golasara : Description of basic astronomical elements and procedures
- Sidhhantadarpana : A short work in 32 slokas enunciating the astronomical constants with reference to the Kalpa and specifying his views on astronomical concepts and topics.
- Candrachayaganita : A work in 32 verses on the methods for the calculation of time from the measurement of the shadow of the gnomon cast by the moon and vice versa.
- Aryabhatiya-bhashya : Elaborate commentary on Aryabhatiya.
- Sidhhantadarpana-vyakhya : Commentary on his own Siddhantadarapana.
- Chandrachhayaganita-vyakhya : Commentary on his own Chandrachhayaganita.
- Sundaraja-prasnottara : Nilakantha's answers to questions posed by Sundaraja, a Tamil Nadu-based astronomer.
- Grahanadi-grantha : Rationale of the necessity of correcting old astronomical constants by observations.
- Grahapariksakrama : Description of the principles and methods for verifying astronomical computations by regular observations.
