= Vidyamadhava =

14th-century Indian astrologer and poet

Vidyāmādhava was an Indian astrologer and poet who flourished around 1350 CE. He lived in a village named Guṇavatī (now known as Gunavante) near Gokarna, Karnataka, on the west coast of India and later settled in a nearby fishing village by the sea named Manki. His father was one Nārāyaṇa Pūjypāda, a scholar in the court of King Mallappa.

He was a member of a Havyaka Brahmin family of Nīlamana. Gunavante village, in the historic Gokarna region of present-day Uttara Kannada district, has traditionally been inhabited by Havyaka Brahmins. Oral traditions preserved among some Havyaka Brahmin families bearing the surname Pandit in Gunavante and Manki trace their ancestry to Vidyamadhava. These families regard the Ganesha temple at Halematha (literally "Old Monastery" in Kannada) in Manki as their Kula Devata (family deity). According to family tradition, the temple, situated near the Arabian Sea, was used by members of the Pandit family for astronomical observations over several centuries.

The best known work of Vidyamadhava is Muhūrtadarśana, a treatise in fifteen chapters dealing with fixing the most auspicious day and time for performing all sorts of religious and other ceremonies. Vidyamadhava's son Viṣṇuśarman has authored a highly acclaimed commentary called Muhūrtadarśana-dīpikā. Both the original Muhūrtadarśana and its commentary Muhūrtadarśana-dīpikā have been highly popular among the astrologers in Kerala. As many as six commentaries, two of which are in Sanskrit and the rest in Malayalam, have been composed by Kerala astrologers. And, because of this, even though the place where Vidyamadhava flourished is not within the geographical boundaries of the present-day region referred to as Kerala, K. V. Sarma has considered him as an illustrious member of the Kerala school of astronomy and mathematics.

Because of the huge popularity of Muhūrtadarśana, later authors have referred to Muhūrtadarśana by different names like Muhūrtamādhavīyaṃ and Vidyamādhavīyaṃ. The complete text of Vidyamādhavīyaṃ with the commentary Muhūrtadarśana-dīpikā by Viṣṇuśarman edited by Dr Shama Sastri has been digitized and is now available in the Internet Archive for free down load. The titles of the fifteen chapters in the book give an idea of the topics discussed in the work: saṃjñā (sign, signal), doṣa (harm), apavāda (defame), guṇa (virtue), balābala (strength and weakness), niṣekādi (insemination etc.), vidyopanayana (initiation to learning, sacred thread ceremony), vivāha (marriage), vāstu (architecture), kṛṣi-bījāvāpa (agriculture, sowing), deva-pratiṣṭhā (consecration of idols), yātrā (travel), prakīrṇaka (tuft of hair), tārādi-lakṣaṇa (indications by stars etc.), puṣpa-graha-gocara (domain of flowers and planets).

== Full text of Vidyamādhavīyaṃ ==
The full text of Vidyamādhavīyaṃ with the commentary by Viṣṇuśarman has been published by University of Mysore in three parts during 1923-1926 which are available in the Internet Archive at the following links:

- Vidyamādhavīyaṃ Part I Chapters 1-5 (385 pages)
- Vidyamādhavīyaṃ Part II Chapters 6-10 (359 pages)
- Vidyamādhavīyaṃ Part III Chapters 11-15 (300 pages)

== Vidyamadhava's other works ==
- Pārvatī-Rukmiṇīya, a kāvya with the marriages of Pārvatī and Ŝiva and Kṛṣṇa and Rukmiṇī as the theme. This is a bitextual work which is a genre of work in Sanskrit literature in which the same text can have two or more different meanings. In Pārvatī-Rukmiṇīya, each verse has two meanings one applicable to the marriage of Śiva and Pārvatī and the other applicable to the marriage of Kṛṣṇa and Rukmiṇī. Thus the work simultaneously describes the two marriages.
- Commentary on Kirātārjunīya, a sixth century CE epic poem by Bhāravi.

== See also ==
- List of astronomers and mathematicians of the Kerala school
- Gunavante
- Idagunji Ganesha
