= Chitrabhanu (mathematician) =

16th century Indian mathematician

Chitrabhanu (IAST: Citrabhānu; fl. 16th century) was a mathematician of the Kerala school and a student of Nilakantha Somayaji. He was a Nambudiri brahmin from the town of Covvaram near present day Trissur. He is noted for a karaṇa, a concise astronomical manual, dated to 1530, an algebraic treatise, and a commentary on a poetic text. Nilakantha and he were both teachers of Shankara Variyar.

== Contributions ==
He gave integer solutions to 21 types of systems of two simultaneous Diophantine equations in two unknowns. These types are all the possible pairs of equations of the following seven forms:

$\ x + y = a, x - y = b, xy = c, x^2 + y^2 = d, x^2 - y^2 = e, x^3 + y^3 = f, x^3 - y^3 = g$

For each case, Chitrabhanu gave an explanation and justification of his rule as well as an example. Some of his explanations are algebraic, while others are geometric.
