= A History of the Kerala School of Hindu Astronomy =

Book by K. V. Sarma

- Author: K. V. Sarma
- Language: English
- Subject: History of astronomy and history of mathematics
- Publisher: Vishveshvarananda Institute of Sanskrit and indological Studies, Panjab University, Hoshiarpur
- Publication date: 1972
- Publication place: India
- Pages: 220
- Website: A History of the Kerala School of Hindu Astronomy (in perspective)

A History of the Kerala School of Hindu Astronomy (in perspective) is the first definitive book giving a comprehensive description of the contribution of Kerala to astronomy and mathematics. The book was authored by K. V. Sarma who was a Reader in Sanskrit at Vishveshvaranand Institute of Sanskrit and Indological Studies, Panjab University, Hoshiarpur, at the time of publication of the book (1972). The book, among other things, contains details of the lives and works of about 80 astronomers and mathematicians belonging to the Kerala School. It has also identified 752 works belonging to the Kerala school.

Even though C. M. Whish, an officer of East India Company, had presented a paper on the achievements of the mathematicians of Kerala School as early as 1834, western scholars had hardly taken note of these contributions. Much later in the 1940s, C. T. Rajagopal and his associates made some efforts to study and popularize the discoveries of Whish. Their work was lying scattered in several journals and as parts of books. Even after these efforts by C. T. Rajagopal and others, the view that Bhaskara II was the last significant mathematician pre-modern India had produced had prevailed among scholars, and surprisingly, even among Indian scholars. It was in this context K. V. Sarma published his book as an attempt to present in a succinct form the results of the investigations of C. T. Rajagopal and others and also the findings of his own investigations into the history of the Kerala school of astronomy and mathematics.

== Summary of the book ==
The book is divided into six chapters. Chapter 1 gives an outline of the salient features of Kerala astronomy. Sarma emphasizes the spirit of inquiry, stress on observation and experimentation, concern for accuracy, and continuity of tradition as the important features of Kerala astronomy. Adherence to the Aryabhatan system, use of the katapayadi system for expressing numbers, the use of the Parahita and Drik systems for astronomical computations are some other important aspects of Kerala astronomy. Chapter 2 gives a brief account of the mathematical discoveries of Kerala mathematicians which anticipate many modern day discoveries in mathematics and astronomy. Among other topics, Sarma specifically mentions the following: Tycho Brahe's reduction to the ecliptic, Taylor series for sine and cosine functions, power series for sine and cosine functions, Lhuier's formula for the circum-radius of a cyclic quadrilateral, Gregory's series for the inverse tangent, and approximations to the value of pi. Chapter 3 contains a discussion on the major trends in the Kerala literature on Jyotisha. This gives an indication of the range and depth of the topics discussed in the Kerala literature on Jyotisha. Chapter 4 is devoted to providing brief accounts of the Kerala authors of mathematical and astronomical works. There are accounts of as many as 80 authors beginning with the legendary Vararuchi I who is believed to have flourished in the 4th century CE and ending with Rama Varma Koittampuran (1853–1910). Chapter 5 is a bibliography of Kerala Jyotisha literature. This chapter contains essential information about as many as 752 works produced by Kerala astronomers and mathematicians. Chapter 6, the last one of the book, discusses works produced in regions outside Kerala, based on Kerala jyotisha.

== See also ==
- Kerala school of astronomy and mathematics
- List of astronomers and mathematicians of the Kerala school

== Notes ==
1. The full text of the book can be accessed from Internet Archive: A History of the Kerala School of Hindu Astronomy (in perspective).
2. The full text of a review of the book appeared in the Indian Journal of History of Science: Sen, S. N.; Bag, A. K. (1973). "Review of A History of the Kerala School of Hindu Astronomy" (PDF). Indian Journal of History of Science. 8 (1 & 2): 117–118.
