= Jyeṣṭhadeva =

Indian scientist and astronomer-mathematician (1500–1575)

- ജ്യേഷ്ഠദേവൻ
- Born: c. 1500
- Died: c. 1575 (aged 74–75)
- Occupation: Astronomer-mathematician
- Known for: Authorship of Yuktibhāṣā
- Notable work: Yuktibhāṣā, Drkkarana
- Relatives: Parangngottu (Sanskritised as Parakroda) family

Notes
- Pupil of Damodara, contemporary of Nilakantha Somayaji, teacher of Achyuta Pisharati

Jyeṣṭhadeva (Malayalam: ജ്യേഷ്ഠദേവൻ; c. 1500 – c. 1575) was an astronomer-mathematician of the Kerala school of astronomy and mathematics founded by Madhava of Sangamagrama (c. 1350 – c. 1425). He is best known as the author of the Yuktibhāṣā, a commentary in Malayalam of the treatise Tantrasamgraha by Nilakantha Somayaji. In the Yuktibhāṣā, Jyeṣṭhadeva gave complete proofs and rationales for the statements in Tantrasamgraha, which was unusual for traditional Indian mathematicians of the time. The Yuktibhāṣā is now believed to contain derivations of Taylor and infinite series expansions for certain trigonometric functions. However, it did not combine several ideas under the unifying concepts of the derivative and the integral, show the connection between the two, or turn calculus into the powerful problem-solving tool we have today. Jyeṣṭhadeva also authored Drk-karana, a treatise on astronomical observations.

== Life period of Jyeṣṭhadeva ==
There are a few references to Jyeṣṭhadeva scattered across several old manuscripts. From these manuscripts, one can deduce a few bare facts about the life of Jyeṣṭhadeva. He was a Nambudiri belonging to the Parangngottu family (Sanskritised as Parakroda) born about the year 1500 CE. He was a pupil of Damodara and a younger contemporary of Nilakantha Somayaji. Acyuta Piṣāraṭi was a pupil of Jyeṣṭhadeva. In the concluding verse of his work Uparagakriyakrama, completed in 1592, Piṣāraṭi referred to Jyeṣṭhadeva as his "aged benign teacher". From a few references in Drk-karana, a work believed to be of Jyeṣṭhadeva, one may conclude that Jyeṣṭhadeva lived up to about 1610 CE. According to K. V. Sarma, the name "Jyeṣṭhadeva" is most probably the Sanskritised form of his personal name in the local language Malayalam.

Parangngottu, the family house of Jyeṣṭhadeva, still exists in the vicinity of Trikkandiyur and Alathiyur. There are also several legends connected with members of the Parangngottu family.

== Mathematical lineage ==
Little is known about the mathematical traditions in Kerala prior to Madhava of Sangamagrama. Madhava taught Parameshvara Nambudiri, who taught Damodara. Damodara taught Nilakantha Somayaji and Jyeṣṭhadeva. Jyeṣṭhadeva taught Acyuta Piṣāraṭi, who taught Melpathur Narayana Bhattathiri.

== Jyeṣṭhadeva's works ==
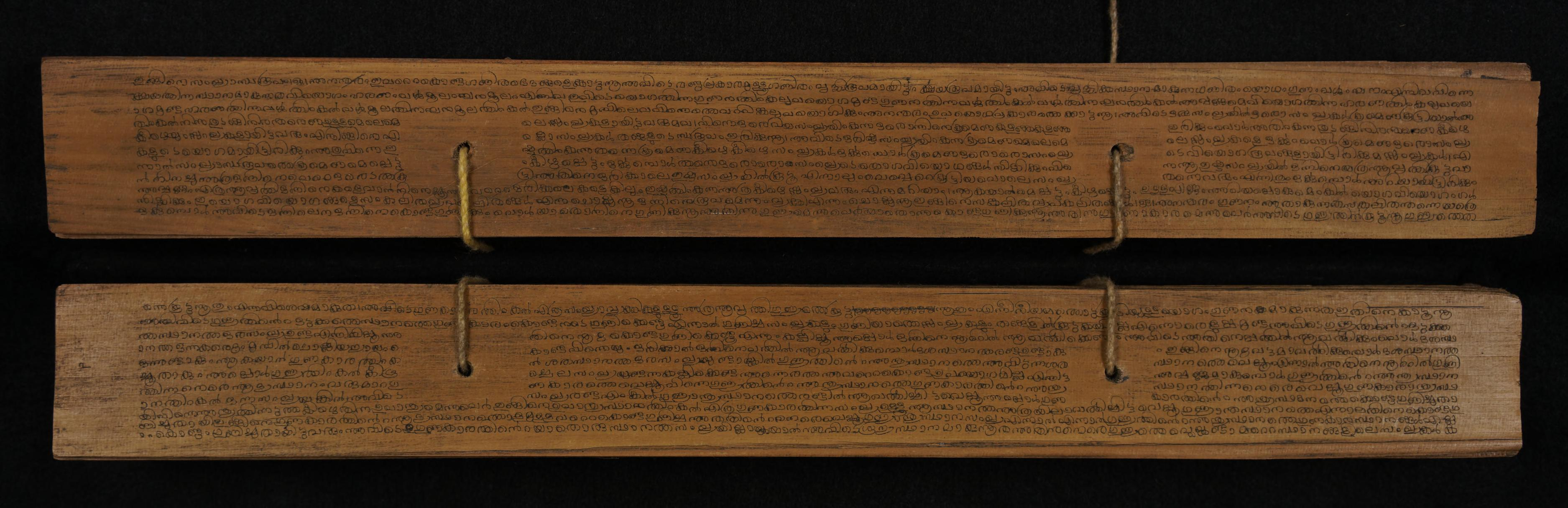
Pages from the Yuktibhasa c.1530

Jyeṣṭhadeva is only known to have composed two works, namely the Yuktibhāṣā and Drk-karana. The former is commentary on Tantrasamgraha by Nilakantha Somayaji and the latter is a treatise on astronomical computations.

Three factors make the Yuktibhāṣā unique in the history of the development of mathematical thinking in the Indian subcontinent:

- It is composed in the spoken language of the local people, namely, the Malayalam language. This is in contrast to the centuries-old Indian tradition of composing scholarly works in the Sanskrit language, which was the language of the learned.
- The work is in prose, also in contrast to the prevailing style of writing even technical manuals in verse. All the other notable works of the Kerala school are in verse.
- Most importantly, the Yuktibhāṣā was composed intentionally as a manual of proofs. The very purpose of writing the book was to record in full detail the rationales of the various results discovered by mathematicians-astronomers of the Kerala school, especially of Somayaji. This book therefore demonstrates that the concept of proof was known to at least some Indian mathematical traditions.

== See also ==
- Kerala School
- Indian mathematics
- Indian mathematicians
- List of astronomers and mathematicians of the Kerala school

== Sources ==
- Bressoud, David (2002), "Was Calculus Invented in India?", The College Mathematics Journal, 33 (1): 2–13, doi:10.2307/1558972, JSTOR 1558972

== Further references ==
- Details on the English translation of Yuktibhāṣā by K. V. Sarma: Sarma, K.V., Ramasubramanian, K., Srinivas, M.D., Sriram, M.S. (2008). Ganita-Yukti-Bhasa (Rationales in Mathematical Astronomy) of Jyeṣṭhadeva: Volume I: Mathematics, Volume II: Astronomy. Sources and Studies in the History of Mathematics and Physical Sciences. Springer jointly with Hindustan Book Agency, New Delhi, India. ISBN 978-1-84882-072-2. (This is a critical translation of the original Malayalam text by K.V. Sarma with explanatory notes by K. Ramasubramanian, M.D. Srinivas and M.S. Sriram.)
- For a review of the English translation of Yuktibhāṣā: Homer S. White (17 July 2009). "Ganita-Yukti-Bhāsā (Rationales in Mathematical Astronomy) of Jyesthadeva". MAA Reviews. The Mathematical Association of America.
- R.C. Gupta (1973). "Addition and subtraction theorems for the sine and the cosine functions in medieval india" (PDF). Indian Journal of History of Science. 9 (2): 164–177. Archived from the original (PDF) on 29 November 2014.
- K. V. Sarma (1972). A history of the Kerala school of Hindu astronomy (in perspective). Vishveshvaranand Indological series. Vol. 55. Vishveshvaranand Institute of Sanskrit & Indological Studies, Hoshiarpur, Panjab University. Bibcode:1972hksh.book.....S.
- K.V. Sarma. "Tradition of Aryabhatiya in Kerala : Revision of planetary parameters" (PDF). Indian Journal of History of Science. 12 (2): 194–199. Archived from the original (PDF) on 29 November 2014.
- George Gheverghese Joseph (2000). The Crest of the Peacock: The Non-European Roots of Mathematics. Princeton University Press. pp. 416. ISBN 978-0-691-00659-8.
- Plofker, Kim (2009). "7 The school of Madhava in Kerala". Mathematics in India. Princeton University Press. pp. 219–254. ISBN 9780691120676.
- For a modern explanation of Jyeṣṭhadeva's proof of the power series expansion of the arctangent function: Victor J. Katz (2009). "12". A history of mathematics: An introduction (3 ed.). Addison Wesley. pp. 450–455. ISBN 978-0-321-38700-4.
