= Govindasvāmi =

Indian mathematical astronomer (800–860)

Govindasvāmi (or Govindasvāmin, Govindaswami) (c. 800 – c. 860) was an Indian mathematical astronomer most famous for his Bhashya, a commentary on the Mahābhāskarīya of Bhāskara I, written around 830. The commentary contains many examples illustrating the use of a Sanskrit place-value system and the construction of a sine table.

His works have been quoted extensively by Sankaranarayana (fl. 869), Udayadivakara (fl. 1073) and Nilakantha Somayaji (c. 1444-1544). Sankaranarayana was the director of the observatory founded in Mahodayapuram, the capital of the Chera kingdom, and is believed to be the student of Govindasvami. In his book, Sankaranarayana gives explanations to the insightful questions of the king Ravi Varma, then ruler of Mahodayapuram and from these references the period of Sankaranarayana is known.

His work Govindakriti was a sequel to Āryabhaṭīya and is lost. Other works attributed to Govindasvami includeGovinda-paddhati (on astrology) and Ganita-mukha (on mathematics). Like Govinda-kriti, these are lost, and known only from mentions and quotations by later writers such as Sankaranarayana and Udayadivakara.

== See also ==
- List of astronomers and mathematicians of the Kerala school
