= Yuktibhāṣā =

Treatise on mathematics and astronomy

Yuktibhasa
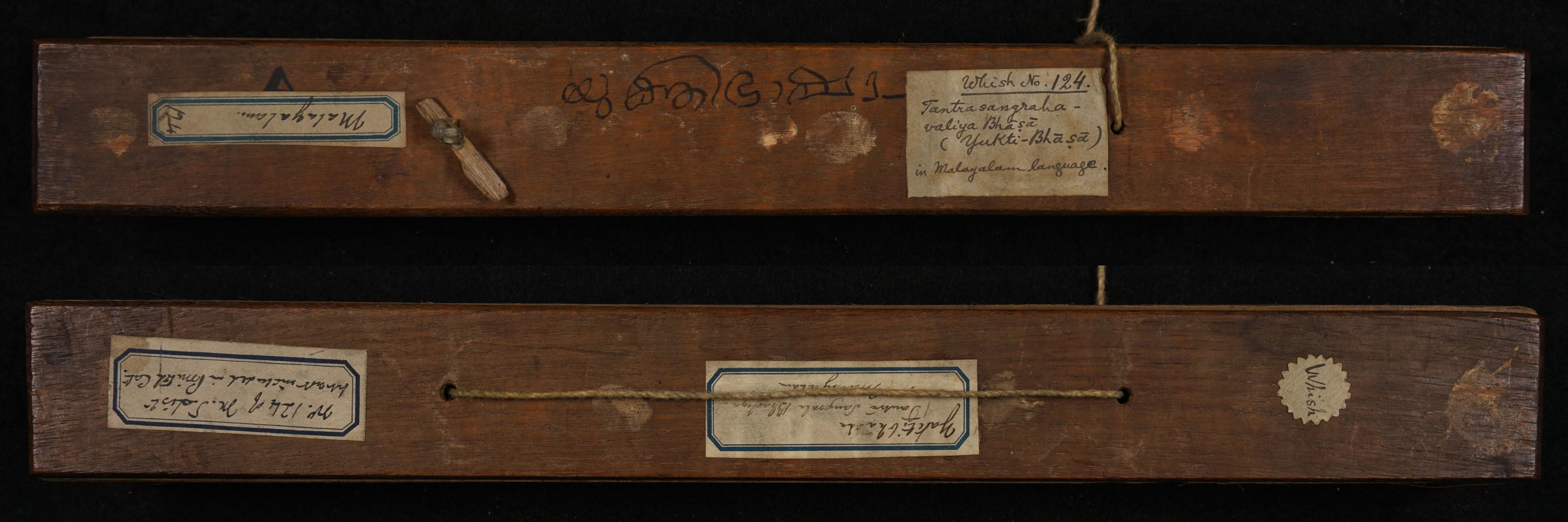
- Front and back cover of the Palm-leaf manuscripts of the Yuktibhasa, composed by Jyesthadeva in 1530
- Author: Jyesthadeva
- Language: Malayalam
- Genre: Mathematics and Astronomy
- Publication date: 1530
- Publication place: Modern-day Kerala, India
- English publication date: 2008

Yuktibhāṣā (Malayalam: യുക്തിഭാഷ, lit. 'Rationale'), also known as Gaṇita-yukti-bhāṣā and Gaṇitanyāyasaṅgraha (English: Compendium of Astronomical Rationale), is a treatise on mathematics and astronomy, written by the Indian astronomer Jyeṣṭhadeva of the Kerala school of mathematics around 1530. The treatise, written in Malayalam, is a consolidation of the discoveries by Madhava of Sangamagrama, Nilakantha Somayaji, Parameshvara Nambudiri, Jyeṣṭhadeva, Achyuta Piṣāraṭi, and other astronomer-mathematicians of the Kerala school. It also exists in a Sanskrit version, with unclear author and date, composed as a rough translation of the Malayalam original.

The work contains proofs and derivations of the theorems that it presents. The Yuktibhāṣā demonstrates that at least some early Indian scholars in astronomy and computation had the concept of proofs.

Some of its important topics include the infinite series expansions of functions; power series, including of π and π/4; trigonometric series of sine, cosine, and arctangent; Taylor series, including second and third order approximations of sine and cosine; radii, diameters, and circumferences.

Yuktibhāṣā mainly gives rationale for the results in Nilakantha's Tantrasamgraha. It is regarded as an early work containing techniques involving infinite series, including series expansions of certain trigonometric functions, predating the works of Newton and Leibniz by approximately two centuries. However, it did not combine several ideas under the unifying concepts of the derivative and the integral, show the connection between the two, or turn calculus into the powerful problem-solving tool we have today. The treatise was largely unnoticed outside India, as it was written in the local language of Malayalam. In modern times, due to wider international cooperation in mathematics, the wider world has taken notice of the work. For example, the University of Oxford and the British Royal Society have given attribution to pioneering mathematical theorems of Indian origin that predate their Western counterparts.

== Contents ==
Yuktibhāṣā contains most of the developments of the earlier Kerala school, particularly those of Madhava and Nilakantha Somayaji. The text is divided into two parts – the former deals with mathematical analysis and the latter with astronomy. Beyond this, the continuous text does not have any further division into subjects or topics, so published editions divide the work into chapters based on editorial judgment.

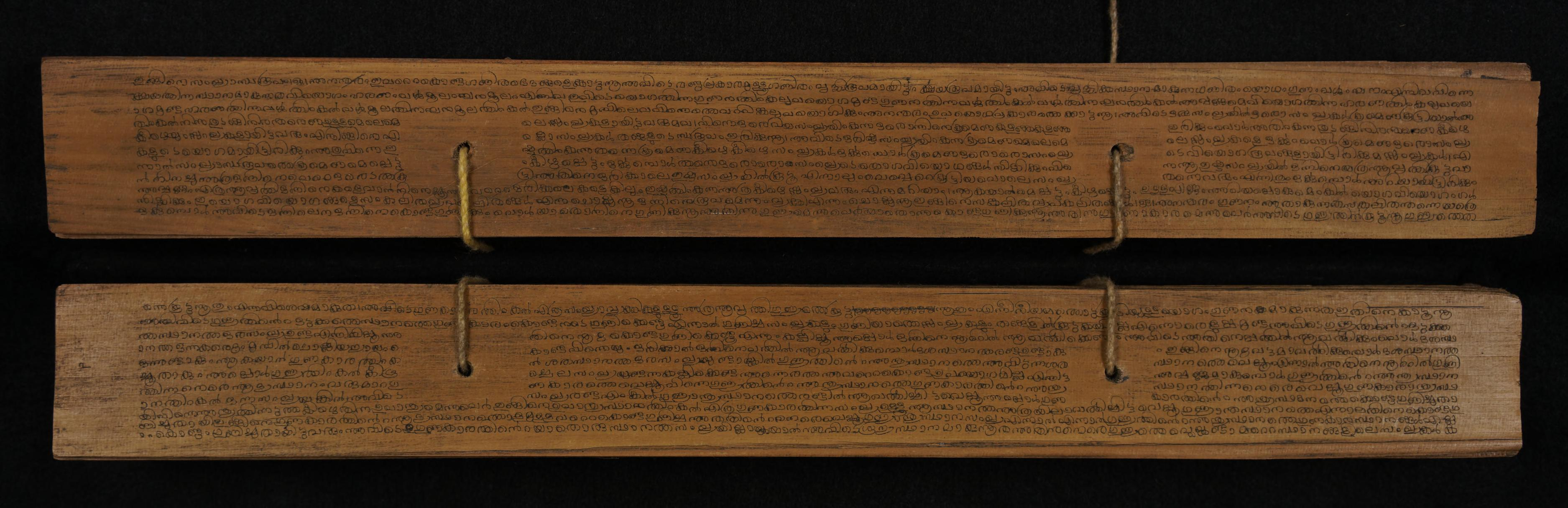
Pages from the Yuktibhasa

=== Mathematics ===
Explanation of the sine rule in Yuktibhāṣā

The subjects treated in the mathematics part of the Yuktibhāṣā can be divided into seven chapters:

1. parikarma: logistics (the eight mathematical operations)
2. daśapraśna: ten problems involving logistics
3. bhinnagaṇita: arithmetic of fractions
4. trairāśika: rule of three
5. kuṭṭakāra: pulverisation (linear indeterminate equations)
6. paridhi-vyāsa: relation between circumference and diameter: infinite series and approximations for π
7. jyānayana: derivation of Rsines: infinite series and approximations for sines.

The first four chapters of the section contain elementary mathematics, such as division, the Pythagorean theorem, square roots, etc. Novel ideas are not discussed until the sixth chapter on the circumference of a circle. Yuktibhāṣā contains a derivation and proof for the power series of inverse tangent discovered by Madhava. In the text, Jyeṣṭhadeva describes Madhava's series in the following manner:

The first term is the product of the given sine and radius of the desired arc divided by the cosine of the arc. The succeeding terms are obtained by a process of iteration when the first term is repeatedly multiplied by the square of the sine and divided by the square of the cosine. All the terms are then divided by the odd numbers 1, 3, 5, .... The arc is obtained by adding and subtracting respectively the terms of odd rank and those of even rank. It is laid down that the sine of the arc or that of its complement whichever is the smaller should be taken here as the given sine. Otherwise the terms obtained by this above iteration will not tend to the vanishing magnitude.

In modern mathematical notation,

$$r\theta={r\frac{\sin\theta}{\cos\theta}}
-\frac{r}{3}\frac{\sin^3\theta}{\cos^3\theta}
+\frac{r}{5}\frac{\sin^5\theta}{\cos^5\theta}
-\frac{r}{7}\frac{\sin^7\theta}{\cos^7\theta}
+\cdots$$

or, expressed in terms of tangents,

$$\theta = \tan\theta - \frac13 \tan^3\theta + \frac15 \tan^5\theta - \cdots \ ,$$

which in Europe was conventionally called Gregory's series after James Gregory, who independently discovered it in 1671.

The text also contains Madhava's infinite series expansion of π which he obtained from the expansion of the arc-tangent function.

$$\frac{\pi}{4} = 1 - \frac{1}{3} + \frac{1}{5} - \frac{1}{7} + \cdots + \frac{(-1)^n}{2n + 1} + \cdots \ ,$$

which in Europe was conventionally called Leibniz's series, after Gottfried Leibniz who independently discovered it in 1673.

Using a rational approximation of this series, Jyeṣṭhadeva gave values of π as 3.14159265359, correct to 11 decimals, and as 3.1415926535898, correct to 13 decimals.

The text describes two methods for computing the value of π. First, obtain a rapidly converging series by transforming the original infinite series of π. By doing so, the first 21 terms of the infinite series

$$\pi = \sqrt{12}\left(1-{1\over 3\cdot3}+{1\over5\cdot 3^2}-{1\over7\cdot 3^3}+\cdots\right)$$

was used to compute the approximation to 11 decimal places. The other method was to add a remainder term to the original series of π. The remainder term$\frac{n^2 + 1}{4n^3 + 5n}$ was used in the infinite series expansion of $\frac{\pi}{4}$ to improve the approximation of π to 13 decimal places of accuracy when n=76.

Apart from these, the Yuktibhāṣā contains many elementary and complex mathematical topics, including,

- Proofs for the expansion of the sine and cosine functions
- The sum and difference formulae for sine and cosine
- Integer solutions of systems of linear equations (solved using a system known as kuttakaram)
- Geometric derivations of series
- Statements of Taylor series for some functions

=== Astronomy ===
Chapters eight to seventeen deal with subjects of astronomy: planetary orbits, celestial spheres, ascension, declination, directions and shadows, spherical triangles, ellipses, and parallax correction. The planetary theory described in the book is similar to that later adopted by Danish astronomer Tycho Brahe. The topics covered in the eight chapters are computation of mean and true longitudes of planets, Earth and celestial spheres, fifteen problems relating to ascension, declination, longitude, etc., determination of time, place, direction, etc., from gnomonic shadow, eclipses, Vyatipata (when the sun and moon have the same declination), visibility correction for planets and phases of the moon.

Specifically,

8. grahagati: planetary motion, bhagola: sphere of the zodiac, madhyagraha: mean planets, sūryasphuṭa: true sun, grahasphuṭa: true planets
9. bhū-vāyu-bhagola: spheres of the earth, atmosphere, and asterisms, ayanacalana: precession of the equinoxes
10. pañcadaśa-praśna: fifteen problems relating to spherical triangles
11. dig-jñāna: orientation, chāyā-gaṇita: shadow computations, lagna: rising point of the ecliptic, nati-lambana: parallaxes of latitude and longitude
12. grahaṇa: eclipse
13. vyatīpāta
14. visibility correction of planets
15. moon's cusps and phases of the moon

== Modern editions ==
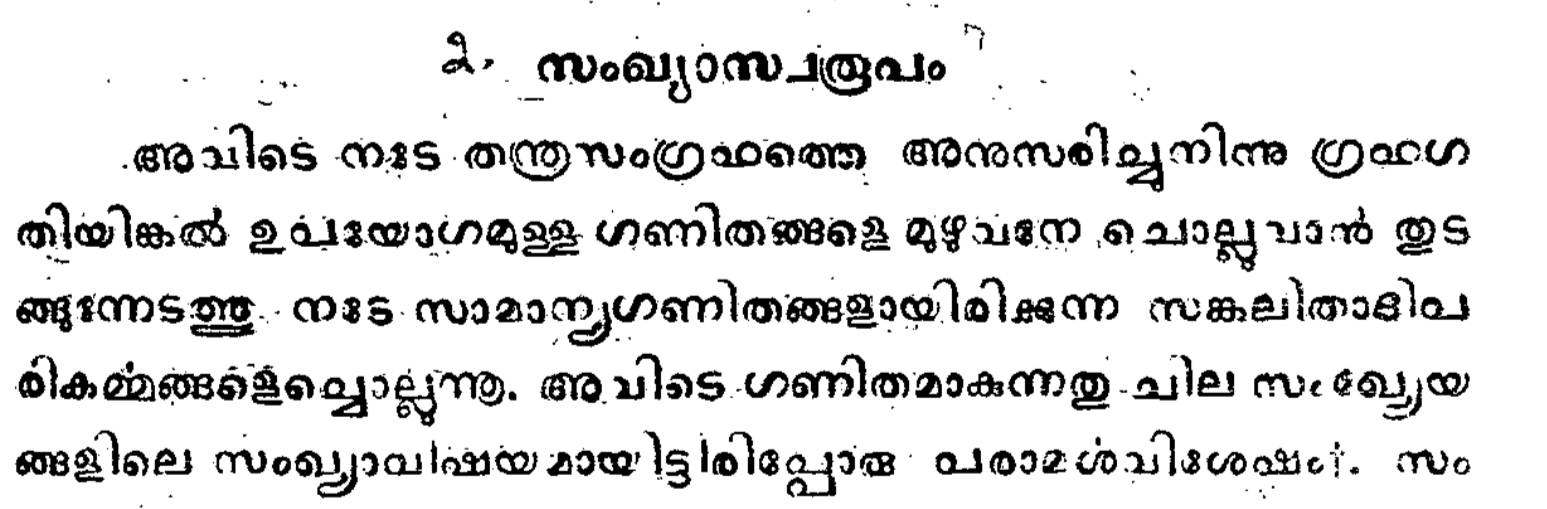
The first verse from Yukti bhasha in Malayalam language

The importance of the Yuktibhāṣā was brought to the attention of modern scholarship by C. M. Whish in 1832 through a paper published in the Transactions of the Royal Asiatic Society of Great Britain and Ireland. The mathematical part of the text, along with notes in Malayalam, was first published in 1948 by Rama Varma Thampuran and Akhileswara Aiyar.

The first critical edition of the entire Malayalam text, alongside an English translation and detailed explanatory notes, was published in two volumes by Springer in 2008. A third volume, containing a critical edition of the Sanskrit Ganitayuktibhasa, was published by the Indian Institute of Advanced Study, Shimla in 2009. This edition of the Yuktibhāṣā has been divided into two volumes: Volume I deals with mathematics and Volume II treats astronomy. Each volume is divided into three parts: the first part is an English translation of the relevant Malayalam part of the Yuktibhāṣā, the second part contains detailed explanatory notes on the translation, and in the third part the text in the Malayalam original is reproduced. The English translation is by K. V. Sarma, and the explanatory notes are provided by K. Ramasubramanian, M. D. Srinivas, and M. S. Sriram.

An open access edition of the Yuktibhāṣā was published by the Sayahna Foundation in 2020.

== See also ==
- Indian mathematics
- Kerala School
- Madhava's correction term
