= Sankara Varman =

Indian astronomer-mathematician (1774–1839)

Sankara Varman (1774–1839) was an astronomer-mathematician belonging to the Kerala school of astronomy and mathematics. He is best known as the author of Sadratnamala, a treatise on astronomy and mathematics, composed in 1819. Sankara Varman is considered as the last notable figure in the long line of illustrious astronomers and mathematicians in the Kerala school of astronomy and mathematics beginning with Madhava of Sangamagrama. Sadratnamala was composed in the traditional style followed by members of the Kerala school at a time when India had been introduced to the western style of mathematics and of writing books in mathematics. One of Varman's contributions to mathematics was his computation of the value of the mathematical constant π correct to 17 decimal places.

== Biographical sketch ==
Varman was born as a younger prince in the principality of Katattanad, in North Malabar, Kerala, in the year 1774. He had two elder brothers, the eldest being Raja Udaya varma, the ruler of the principality, and second one being Rama Varma, the crown prince. Local people referred to Varman as Appu Thampuran. Katattanad principality was under the suzerainty of the Zamorin of Calicut. The family deity of Sankara Varman was Goddess Parvati installed in the temple of Lokamalayarkavu and he was also a devotee of Lord Krishna.

Varman completed the composition of Sadratnamala in 1819. He also wrote a Malayalam commentary on Sadratnamala. Two versions of the text of Sadratnamala and their commentaries have been discovered. A critical examination of the manuscripts suggests that both are written by Varman, one being a revision of the other.

During the invasion of Malabar by Tipu Sultan/Hyder Ali during 1766 - 1781, many people including members of royal families fled Malabar and took shelter in Travancore. This brought the principality of Katattanad also into close contact with the Travancore Royal Family. Varman was especially attached to Maharaja Swati Tirunal (1813–47).

Varman was an astute astrologer. There is a legend that he predicted the time of his own death as being in 1839, the year in which he died.

== Whish's acquaintance ==
Varman was a close acquaintance of C.M. Whish a civil servant of East India Company attached to its Madras establishment. Whish spoke of him and his work thus: "The author of Sadratnamalah is SANCARA VARMA, the younger brother of the present Raja of Cadattanada near Tellicherry, a very intelligent man and acute mathematician. This work, which is a complete system of Hindu astronomy, is comprehended in two hundred and eleven verses of different measures, and abounds with fluxional forms and series, to be found in no work of foreign or other Indian countries." Whish was the first to bring to the notice of the western mathematical scholarship the achievements of the Kerala school of astronomy and mathematics.

== See also ==
- List of astronomers and mathematicians of the Kerala school
