= Udayadivākara =

Indian astronomer and mathematician

Udayadivākara (c. 1073 CE) was an Indian astronomer and mathematician who authored an influential and elaborate commentary, called Sundari, on Laghu-bhāskarīya of Bhāskara I. No personal details about Udayadivākara are known. Since the commentary Sundari takes the year 1073 CE as its epoch, probably the commentary was completed about that year. Sundari has not yet been published and is available only in manuscript form. Some of these manuscripts are preserved in the manuscript depositories in Thiruvananthapuram. According to K. V. Sarma, historian of the astronomy and mathematics of the Kerala school, Udayadivākara probably hailed from Kerala, India.

== Historical significance of Sundari ==
Apart from the fact that Sundari is an elaborate commentary, it has some historical significance. It has quoted extensively from a now lost work by a little-known mathematician Jayadeva. The quotations relate to the cakravala method for solving indeterminate integral equations of the form $Nx^2+1=y^2$. This shows that the method predates Bhaskara II contrary to generally held beliefs. Another important reference to Jayadeva’s work is the solution of the indeterminate equation of the form $Nx^2 + C = y^2$, $C$ being positive or negative.

== A problem and its solution ==
Udayadivākara used his method for solving the equation $Nx^2 + C = y^2$ to obtain some particular solutions to a certain algebraic problem. The problem and Udayadivākara's solution to the problem are presented below only to illustrate the techniques used by Indian astronomers for solving algebraic equations.

=== Problem ===
Find positive integers $x$ and $y$ satisfying the following conditions:

$$\begin{align}
x+y & =  \text{a prefect square},\\
x-y & =  \text{a prefect square},\\
xy+1 & =  \text{a prefect square}.
\end{align}$$

=== Solution ===
To solve the problem, Udayadivākara makes a series of apparently arbitrary assumptions all aimed at reducing the problem to one of solving an indeterminate equation of the form $Nx^2+C=y^2$.

Udayadivākara begins by assuming that $xy+1=(2y+1)^2$ which can be written in the form $x-y=3y+4$. He next assumes that $3y+4 = (3z+2)^2$ which, together with the earlier equation, yields

$$\begin{align}
x & =12z^2+16z+4,\\
y &= 3z^2+4z,\\
x+y & = 15z^2+20z+4.
\end{align}$$

Now, Udayadivākara puts

$$15z^2+20z+4 = u^2$$

which is then transformed to the equation

$$(30z+20)^2= 60u^2+160.$$

This equation is of the form $Nx^2+C=\lambda^2$ with $N=60$, $C=160$ and $\lambda = 30z+20$. Using the method for solving the equation $Nx^2+C=y^2$, Udayadivākara finds the following solutions $( u=2, \lambda=20)$, $( u=18, \lambda=140)$ and $( u=8802, \lambda=68180)$ from which the values of $x$ and $y$ are obtained by back substitution.

== See also ==
- List of astronomers and mathematicians of the Kerala school
