= Sadratnamala =

Book by Sankara Varman

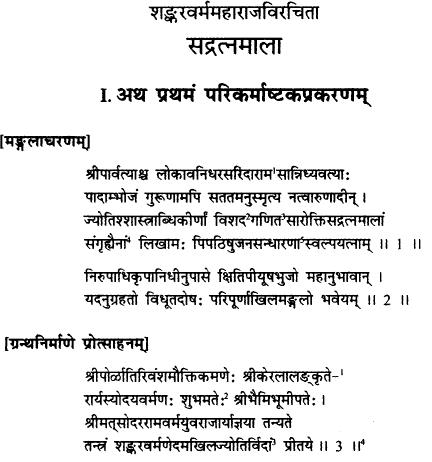
- Opening verses of Sadratnamala (in Devanagari)
- Author: Sankara Varman (1774–1839)
- Language: Sanskrit
- Subject: Astronomy/Mathematics
- Publication date: 1819 CE
- Publication place: India

Sadratnamala is an astronomical-mathematical treatise in Sanskrit written by Sankara Varman, an astronomer-mathematician of the Kerala school of mathematics, in 1819. Even though the book has been written at a time when western mathematics and astronomy had been introduced in India, it is composed purely in the traditional style followed by the mathematicians of the Kerala school. Sankara Varman has also written a detailed commentary on the book in Malayalam.

Sadratnamala is one of the books cited in C. M. Whish's paper on the achievements of the Kerala school of mathematics. This paper published in the Transactions of the Royal Asiatic Society of Great Britain and Ireland in 1834, was the first ever attempt to bring the accomplishments of Keralese mathematicians to the attention of Western mathematical scholarship.

Whish wrote in his paper thus: "The author of Sadratnamalah is SANCARA VARMA, the younger brother of the present Raja of Cadattanada near Tellicherry, a very intelligent man and acute mathematician. This work, which is a complete system of Hindu astronomy, is comprehended in two hundred and eleven verses of different measures, and abounds with fluxional forms and series, to be found in no work of foreign or other Indian countries."

== Synopsis of the book ==
The book contains 212 verses divided into six chapters, called prakarana-s.

- Chapter 1: Gives the names of numerals; defines the eight operations of addition, subtraction, multiplication, division, squaring, extracting square root, cubing, and extracting cube root.
- Chapter 2: Lists the different measures, namely, the measures of time, angles, lunar days, planets and stars, almanacs, length, grain weight, money and the directions.
- Chapter 3: Defines the rule of three and syllabic enumeration; explains methods for the computation of the elements of the almanac, namely, mean and true sun, moon and planets, lunar day, yoga and karana; gives methods for determining the time elapsed after sunrise and after sunset.
- Chapter 4: Deals with arcs and sines and its application in astronomical measurements and computations.
- Chapter 5: Deals with computations relating to the shadow, eclipse, vyatipata, retrograde motion of the planets and apses of the moon.
- Chapter 6: Explains the necessity of periodic revision of astronomical constants; gives a full description of parahita-karana.

== Sankara Varman (1774–1839) ==
Sankara Varman, author of Sadratnamala, was born as a younger prince in the principality of Katathanad in the North Malabar in Kerala. To the local people he was known as Appu Thampuran. The date of birth of Sankara Varman is still uncertain. There are some strong arguments in favour of the year 1774 CE. Sankara Varman died in 1839 CE.
