= Damodara =

15th century Indian astronomer-mathematician

Vatasseri Damodara Nambudiri was an astronomer-mathematician of the Kerala school of astronomy and mathematics who flourished during the fifteenth century CE. He was a son of Paramesvara (1360–1425) who developed the drigganita system of astronomical computations. The family home of Paramesvara was Vatasseri (sometimes called Vatasreni) in the village of Alathiyur, Tirur in Kerala.

Damodara was a teacher of Nilakantha Somayaji. As a teacher he initiated Nilakantha into the science of astronomy and taught him the basic principles in mathematical computations.

== See also ==
- List of astronomers and mathematicians of the Kerala school
