= Drigganita =

System of astronomical computations

Drigganita (दृग्गणित; IAST: dṛggaṇita, from dṛk-gaṇita, "sight-calculation"), also called the Drik system, is a system of astronomical computations followed by several traditional astronomers, astrologers and almanac makers in India. In this system the computations are performed using certain basic constants derived from observations of astronomical phenomena. The almanacs computed using the methods of Drigganita are referred to as Drigganita Panchangas.

The Drigganita system is in contrast to the method followed by some other almanac makers who use the values given in the ancient astronomical treatise known by the name Surya Siddhanta. The almanacs computed using this treatise are known as Sydhantic Panchangas. They are also known as Vakya Panchangas.

In the history of astronomy in India, two different Drigganita systems have been introduced at two different points of time and at two different geographical locations. The first system was introduced by the Kerala astronomer-mathematicians Parameshvara (1380-1460) and Damodara in the fifteenth century. Incidentally, Drigganita is also the title of a book authored by Parameshvara through which the Drik system was promulgated. In the nineteenth century, a second Drigganita system was introduced by Chinthamani Ragoonatha Chary (1822 – 5 February 1880) an Indian astronomer attached to the then Madras Observatory.

== Drigganita of Paramesvara ==
The Drigganita system propounded by Parameshvara was a revision of the Parahita system introduced by Haridatta in the year 683 CE. No new methodology was introduced as part of the Drigganita system. Instead, new multipliers and divisors were given for the computation of the Kali days and for the calculation of the mean positions of the planets. Revised values are given for the positions of planets at zero Kali. Also the values of the sines of arc of anomaly (manda-jya) and of commutation (sighra-jya) are revised and are given for intervals of 6 degrees.

A large number of manuals have been composed describing the Drik system. Since the results obtained using the Drigganita system are more accurate, the astronomers and astrologers use the system for casting horoscopes, for conducting astrological queries and for the computations of eclipses. However, the older parahita system continues to be used for fixing auspicious times for rituals and ceremonies.

== Drigganita of Ragoonatha Chary ==
Chintamani Ragoonathachary, a native astronomer took the initiative to modify and publish a new almanac and thereby introduced a change in the calendrical system followed in the Tamil region. It was clear during the middle of the nineteenth century that the traditional calendars were way off the mark. Not only were there errors in the position of stars, the old system predicted eclipses when there would be none. As the traditional almanac was seen to be quite inaccurate, Chatre and Khetkar in Bombay, Venkatakrishna Raya and Ragoonathachari in Madras proposed Drigganitha Panchang to replace the traditional Panchang computations based on the Vakya Panchang. Ragoonathachari had to face the criticism of the traditionalists who argued against such improvements and criticized him for his scientific zeal. Ragoonathachary’s Drigganitha Panchang not only provided the traditional five calendarical elements but also provided concordance with English months and dates. Therefore, this Panchang was of more practical utility; native officials working in government establishments or those dealing with government found it handy. At the end of a lot of, often acrimonious, Drig vs. Vakya debate, a meeting was called at Sankara Mutt at Kumbakonam and the meeting arrived at the conclusion that the Drig system needs to be followed and a new almanac to be prepared on those lines. Accordingly, the head of the Mutt, issued a srimugam (message of blessing) in 1877 affirming support for the Drig system. From then on a Drig almanac began to be published under the auspices of Kanchi Sankaracharya Matt in the name of 'Sri Kanchi Math almanac'.

== See also ==
- Parahita
- Tirugaṇita-pañcāṅgam
