= Jayadeva (mathematician) =

11th-century Indian mathematician

Jayadeva (c. 1000 CE) was an Indian mathematician, who further developed the cyclic method (Chakravala method) that was called by Hermann Hankel "the finest thing achieved in the theory of numbers before Lagrange (18th century)". He also made significant contributions to combinatorics.

Jayadeva's works are lost, and he is known only from a 20-verse quotation in Udaya-divakara Sundari (c. 1073), a commentary on Bhaskara I's Laghu-bhaskariya. This means that Jayadeva must have lived sometime before 1073, possibly around 1000 CE.

== See also ==
- List of Indian mathematicians
