= C. M. Whish =

Charles Matthew Whish (1794–1833) was an English civil servant in the Madras Establishment of the East India Company. Whish was the first to bring to the notice of the western mathematical scholarship the achievements of the Kerala school of astronomy and mathematics. Whish wrote in his historical paper: Kerala mathematicians had ... laid the foundation for a complete system of fluxions ... and their works ... abound with fluxional forms and series to be found in no work of foreign countries. Whish was also a linguist and had prepared a grammar and a dictionary of the Malayalam language.

C.M. Whish was a collector of palm-leaf manuscripts in Sanskrit and other languages. After his premature death in 1833 at the age of thirty-eight years, Whish's brother, J.L. Whish, who was also employed in the service of East India Company deposited these manuscripts in the Royal Asiatic Society of Great Britain and Ireland in July 1836. A catalogue of these manuscripts list 195 items. Though the manuscripts collected by Whish are not distinguished by great age, there are many rare and valuable ones among them. Perhaps the most important of all are the Mahabharata manuscripts which represent a distinct recension of the great epic. These manuscripts were related a wide range of subjects: vedic literature, ancient epic poetry, classical Sanskrit Literature, and technical and scientific literature.

He joined the service of East India Company in 1812 as Register of Zillah Court in South Malabar and rose up the judicial ladder to become finally a Criminal Judge at Cuddapah. Cuddapah Town Cemetery had a tomb in the name of C.M. Whish with the inscription "Sacred to the memory of C.M. Whish, Esquire of the Civil Service, who departed this life on the 14th April 1833, aged 38 years".
