= Kerala school of astronomy and mathematics =

Hindu astronomy, mathematics, science school in India

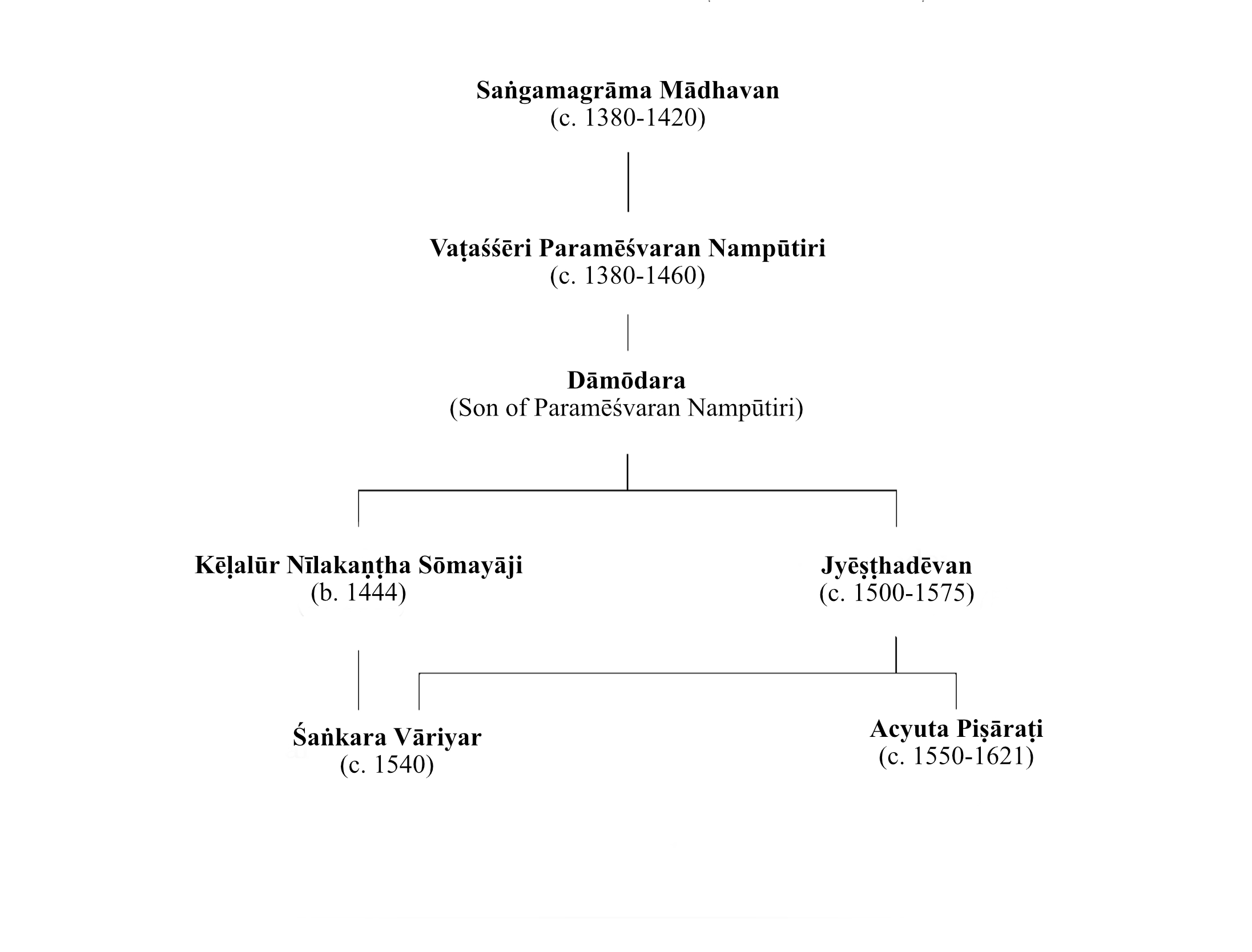
- Chain of teachers of the Kerala school
- Tirur, Kerala, India

Information
- Type: Astronomy, Mathematics, Science
- Founder: Madhava of Sangamagrama

The Kerala school of astronomy and mathematics was a school of mathematics and astronomy founded by Madhava of Sangamagrama in Irinjalakuda, Kerala, India, which included among its members: Parameshvara, Nilakantha Somayaji, Jyeshtadeva, Achyuta Pisharati, Melpathur Narayana Bhattathiri, Achyuta Panikkar. The school flourished between the 14th and 16th centuries and its original discoveries seem to have ended with Narayana Bhattathiri (1559–1632). In attempting to solve astronomical problems, the Kerala school independently discovered a number of important mathematical concepts. Their most important results—series expansion for trigonometric functions—were described in Sanskrit verse in a book by Neelakanta called Tantrasangraha (around 1500), and again in a commentary on this work, called Tantrasangraha-vakhya, of unknown authorship. The theorems were stated without proof, but proofs for the series for sine, cosine, and inverse tangent were provided a century later in the work Yuktibhasa (c. 1530), written in Malayalam, by Jyesthadeva, and also in a commentary on Tantrasangraha.

Their work, completed two centuries before the invention of calculus in Europe, provided what is now considered the first example of a power series (apart from geometric series).

== Background ==
Islamic scholars nearly developed a general formula for finding integrals of polynomials by 1000 AD —and evidently could find such a formula for any polynomial in which they were interested. But, it appears, they were not interested in any polynomial of degree higher than four, at least in any of the material that has been found to date. Indian scholars, on the other hand, were by the year 1600 able to use formula similar to Ibn al-Haytham's sum formula for arbitrary integral powers in calculating power series for the functions in which they were interested. By the same time, they also knew how to calculate the differentials of these functions. So some of the basic ideas of calculus were known in Egypt and India many centuries before Isaac Newton. It does not appear, however, that either Islamic or Indian mathematicians saw the necessity of connecting some of the disparate ideas that we include under the name calculus. They were apparently only interested in specific cases in which these ideas were needed.

== Contributions ==
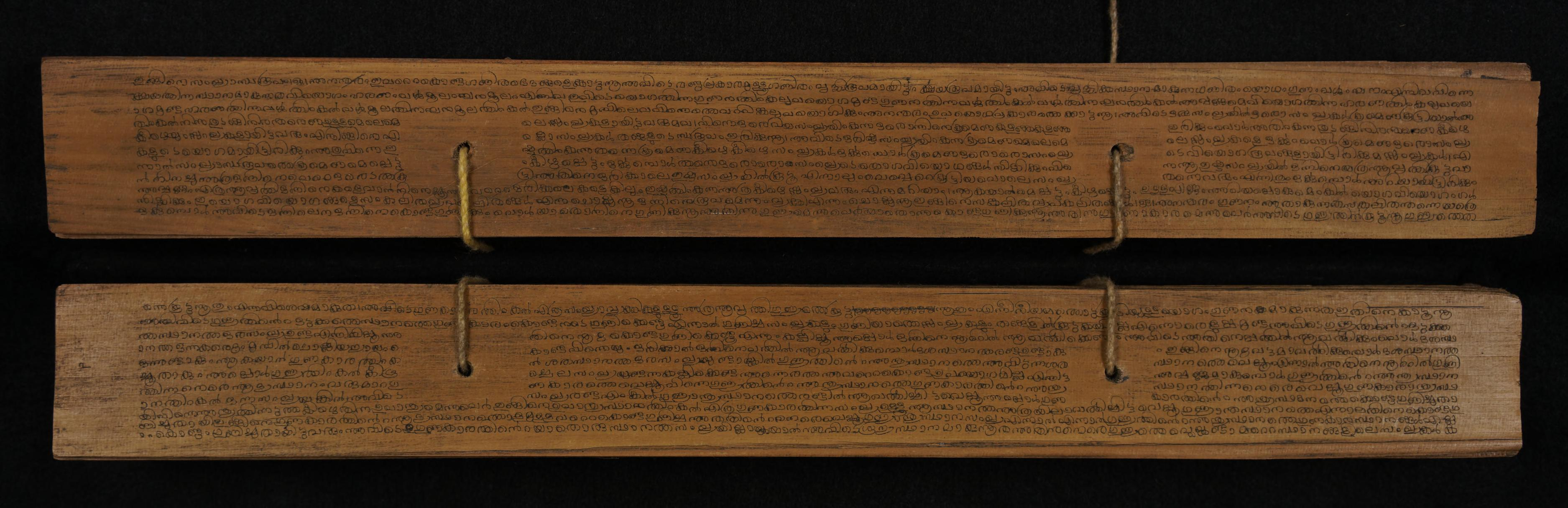
Pages from the Yuktibhasa c.1530

=== Infinite series ===
The Kerala school has made a number of contributions to the fields of infinite series .These include the following infinite geometric series:

$\frac{1}{1-x} = 1 + x + x^2 + x^3 + \cdots \text{ for } |x|<1$

The Kerala school made intuitive use of mathematical induction, though the inductive hypothesis was not yet formulated or employed in proofs. They used this to discover a semi-rigorous proof of the result:

$1^p+ 2^p + \cdots + n^p \approx \frac{n^{p+1}}{p+1}$

for large n.

They applied ideas from (what was to become) differential and integral calculus to obtain (Taylor–Maclaurin) infinite series for $\sin x$, $\cos x$, and $\arctan x$. The Tantrasangraha-vakhya gives the series in verse, which when translated to mathematical notation, can be written as:

$r\arctan\left(\frac{y}{x}\right) = \frac{1}{1}\cdot\frac{ry}{x} -\frac{1}{3}\cdot\frac{ry^3}{x^3} + \frac{1}{5}\cdot\frac{ry^5}{x^5} - \cdots, \text{ where } \frac y x \leq 1.$
$r\sin \frac{x}{r} = x - x\cdot\frac{x^2}{(2^2+2)r^2} + x\cdot \frac{x^2}{(2^2+2)r^2}\cdot\frac{x^2}{(4^2+4)r^2} - \cdots$
$r \left( 1 - \cos \frac{x}{r} \right) = r \frac{x^2}{(2^2-2)r^2} - r \frac{x^2}{(2^2-2)r^2}\cdot \frac{x^2}{(4^2-4)r^2} + \cdots$

where, for $r = 1,$ the series reduce to the standard power series for these trigonometric functions, for example:

$\sin x = x - \frac{x^3}{3!} + \frac{x^5}{5!} - \frac{x^7}{7!} + \cdots$ and
$\cos x = 1 - \frac{x^2}{2!} + \frac{x^4}{4!} - \frac{x^6}{6!} + \cdots$

(The Kerala school did not use the "factorial" symbolism.)

The Kerala school made use of the rectification (computation of length) of the arc of a circle to give a proof of these results. (The later method of Leibniz, using quadrature (i.e. computation of area under the arc of the circle), was not yet developed.) They also made use of the series expansion of $\arctan x$ to obtain an infinite series expression (later known as Gregory series) for $\pi$:

$\frac{\pi}{4} = 1 - \frac{1}{3} + \frac{1}{5} - \frac{1}{7} + \cdots$

Their rational approximation of the error for the finite sum of their series are of particular interest. For example, the error, $f_i(n+1)$, (for n odd, and i = 1, 2, 3) for the series:

$\frac{\pi}{4} \approx 1 - \frac{1}{3}+ \frac{1}{5} - \cdots (-1)^{(n-1)/2}\frac{1}{n} + (-1)^{(n+1)/2}f_i(n+1)$
where $f_1(n) = \frac{1}{2n}, \ f_2(n) = \frac{n/2}{n^2+1}, \ f_3(n) = \frac{(n/2)^2+1}{(n^2+5)n/2}.$

They manipulated the terms, using the partial fraction expansion of :$\frac{1}{n^3-n}$ to obtain a more rapidly converging series for $\pi$:

$\frac{\pi}{4} = \frac{3}{4} + \frac{1}{3^3-3} - \frac{1}{5^3-5} + \frac{1}{7^3-7} - \cdots$

They used the improved series to derive a rational expression, $104348/33215$ for $\pi$ correct up to nine decimal places, i.e. $3.141592653$. They made use of an intuitive notion of a limit to compute these results. The Kerala school mathematicians also gave a semi-rigorous method of differentiation of some trigonometric functions, though the notion of a function, or of exponential or logarithmic functions, was not yet formulated.

=== Recognition ===
In 1825 John Warren published a memoir on the division of time in southern India, called the Kala Sankalita, which briefly mentions the discovery of infinite series by Kerala astronomers.

The works of the Kerala school were first written up for the Western world by Englishman C. M. Whish in 1835. According to Whish, the Kerala mathematicians had "laid the foundation for a complete system of fluxions" and these works abounded "with fluxional forms and series to be found in no work of foreign countries". However, Whish's results were almost completely neglected until over a century later, when the discoveries of the Kerala school were investigated again by C. T. Rajagopal and his associates. Their work includes commentaries on the proofs of the arctan series in Yuktibhasa given in two papers, a commentary on the Yuktibhasa's proof of the sine and cosine series and two papers that provide the Sanskrit verses of the Tantrasangrahavakhya for the series for arctan, sine, and cosine (with English translation and commentary).

In 1972 K. V. Sarma published his A History of the Kerala School of Hindu Astronomy which described features of the School such as the continuity of knowledge transmission from the 13th to the 17th century: Govinda Bhattathiri to Parameshvara to Damodara to Nilakantha Somayaji to Jyesthadeva to Acyuta Pisarati. Transmission from teacher to pupil conserved knowledge in "a practical, demonstrative discipline like astronomy at a time when there was not a proliferation of printed books and public schools."

In 1994 it was argued that the heliocentric model had been adopted about 1500 A.D. in Kerala.

== Possible transmission of Kerala school results to Europe ==
The Kerala school worked with power series for trigonometric functions, an idea now considered part of calculus, approximately 250 to 300 years before the same concept appeared in Europe. Both the Indian and Arab scholars made mathematical discoveries before the 17th century that are now considered a part of calculus. However, according to historian Victor J. Katz, they had yet to "combine many differing ideas under the two unifying themes of the derivative and the integral, show the connection between the two, and turn calculus into the great problem-solving tool we have today." Mainstream historians generally agree that Isaac Newton and Gottfried Wilhelm Leibniz later formulated these unified systems of calculus independently, building upon earlier European and Islamic mathematics.

The question of whether European mathematicians were influenced by the Kerala School remains an ongoing topic of scholarly debate. In 1979, A. K. Bag also proposed that knowledge of these results might have been transmitted to Europe through trade routes by merchants and Jesuit missionaries, as Kerala maintained continuous contact with China, Arabia, and Europe. While communication routes and chronologies make this transmission a possibility, there is currently no direct manuscript evidence demonstrating that such a transfer took place. According to mathematician David Bressoud, "there is no evidence that the Indian work of series was known beyond India, or even outside of Kerala, until the nineteenth century." Similarly, Katz noted that some ideas of the Kerala School share similarities with the work of the 11th-century Iraqi scholar Ibn al-Haytham, suggesting a possible earlier transmission of mathematical concepts from the Islamic world to Kerala.

The intellectual careers of both Newton and Leibniz are well documented, and there is no indication that their work was not their own; however, it is not known with certainty whether their immediate predecessors, "including, in particular, Fermat and Roberval, learned of some of the ideas of the Islamic and Indian mathematicians through sources of which we are not now aware."

== See also ==
- Indian astronomy
- Indian mathematics
- Indian mathematicians
- History of mathematics
- A History of the Kerala School of Hindu Astronomy
- List of astronomers and mathematicians of the Kerala school
