= Nilakantha Somayaji =

Indian mathematician and astronomer (1444–1544)

- കേളല്ലൂർ നീലകണ്ഠ സോമയാജി
- Born: 14 June 1444; Tirur, Kingdom of Tanur
- Died: 1544
- Other name: Kelallur Comatiri
- Occupation: Astronomer-mathematician
- Known for: Authorship of Tantrasamgraha
- Notable work: Golasara, Candrachayaganita, Aryabhatiya-bhashya, Tantrasamgraha
- Title: Somayaji
- Spouse: Arya
- Children: Rama, Dakshinamurti
- Parent: Jatavedan (father)

Keļallur Nīlakaṇṭha Somayāji (14 June 1444 – 1544), also referred to as Keļallur Comatiri, was an Indian mathematician and astronomer of the Kerala school of astronomy and mathematics. He was renowned for his integration of Sanskrit astronomical epistemology with mathematical analysis. One of his most influential works was the comprehensive astronomical treatise Tantrasamgraha (completed in 1500—1501 CE), in which he developed a computational planetary model where interior and exterior planets orbit the Sun, and the Sun in turn orbits the Earth. This model is similar to Tycho Brahe's model . He had also composed an elaborate commentary on Aryabhatiya called the Āryabhaṭīyabhāṣya, that provides mathematical demonstrations (upapatti and yukti) for infinite series and irrationality of $\pi$ (pi). In this Bhasya, Nilakantha has discussed infinite series expansions of trigonometric functions, planet theory, and problems of algebra and spherical geometry. Grahapariksakrama is a manual on making observations in astronomy based on instruments of the time.

== Early life ==
Nilakantha was born into a Brahmin family which came from South Malabar in Kerala.

== Biographical details ==
Like several scholars of Kerala school of astronomy and mathematics, Nilakantha Somayaji documented precise chronological, familial and regional autobiographical details and commentaries of his work using the Katapayādi systems.

In one of his works titled Siddhanta-star and also in his own commentary on Siddhanta-darpana, Nilakantha Somayaji stated that he was born on Kali-day 1,660,181 which works out to 14 June 1444 CE. A contemporary reference to Nilakantha Somayaji in a Malayalam work on astrology implies that Somayaji lived to a ripe old age even to become a centenarian. Sankara Variar, a pupil of Nilakantha Somayaji, in his commentary on Tantrasamgraha titled Tantrasamgraha-vyakhya, points out that the first and last verses of Tantrasamgraha contain chronograms specifying the Kali-days of the commencement (1,680,548) and of completion (1,680,553) of Somayaji's magnum opus Tantrasamgraha. Both these days occur in 1500 CE.

In Aryabhatiya-bhashya, Nilakantha Somayaji has stated that he was the son of Jatavedas and he had a brother named Sankara. Somayaji has further stated that he was a Bhatta belonging to the Gargya gotra and was a follower of Asvalayana-sutra of Rigveda. References in his own Laghuramayana indicate that Nilakantha Somayaji was a member of the Kelallur family (Sanskritised as Kerala-sad-grama) residing at Kundagrama, now known as Trikkandiyur in modern Tirur, Kerala. His wife was named Arya and he had two sons Rama and Dakshinamurti.

Nilakantha Somayaji studied vedanta and some aspects of astronomy under one Ravi. However, it was Damodara, son of Kerala-drgganita author Paramesvara, who initiated him into the science of astronomy and instructed him in the basic principles of mathematical computations. The great Malayalam poet Thunchaththu Ramanujan Ezhuthachan is said to have been a student of Nilakantha Somayaji.

The epithet Somayaji is a title conferred upon a Nambudiri Brahmin who has performed the vedic Somayajña (or Somayāga) ritual, indicating that Nilakantha completed this ritual. In Malayalam, the Sanskrit term Somayāji evolved phonologically as Comātiri (or Chomāthiri).

Somayāji’s "Āryabhaṭīyabhāṣya" is the most extensive commentary on Āryabhaṭīya. He takes all pains to expose the rationale and the objective behind the statements and observations made by Āryabhaṭa.

== Nilakantha Somayaji as a polymath ==
Nilakantha's writings substantiate his knowledge of several branches of Indian philosophy and culture. It is said that he could refer to a Mimamsa authority to establish his view-point in a debate and with equal felicity apply a grammatical dictum to the same purpose. In his writings he refers to a Mimamsa authority, quotes extensively from Pingala's chandas-sutra, scriptures, Dharmasastras, Bhagavata and Vishnupurana also. He cites many passages from classical works on Mīmāṃsā system of philosophy for stressing the need for continuity of investigation. He cites passages from Śabarasvāmibhāṣya, Bṛhaṭṭīkā, Tantravārttika, Paritoṣamiśra’s Ajitā commentary, the Vijayā commentary on Ajitā and Pārthasārathimiśra’s Nyāyaratnamālā. Sundararaja, a contemporary Tamil astronomer, refers to Nilakantha as sad-darshani-parangata, one who had mastered the six systems of Indian philosophy.

== Astronomy ==
In his Tantrasangraha, Nilakantha revised Aryabhata's model for the planets Mercury and Venus. According to George G. Joseph his equation of the centre for these planets remained the most accurate until the time of Johannes Kepler in the 17th century.

In his Aryabhatiyabhasya, a commentary on Aryabhata's Aryabhatiya, Nilakantha developed a computational system for a partially heliocentric planetary model in which Mercury, Venus, Mars, Jupiter and Saturn orbit the Sun, which in turn orbits the Earth, similar to the Tychonic system later proposed by Tycho Brahe in the late 16th century. Most astronomers of the Kerala school who followed him accepted this planetary model.

Somayaji consistently argued that astronomical parameters and computational models must undergo periodic revision based on continuous observations (dṛk-gaṇita-aikya). He also asserts that, when observation (pratyakṣa) and rationale (yukti) contradict the practiced tradition, the observable reality must guide the mathematical model. His specialized work Jyotirmīmāṃsā explicitly establishes a scientific epistemology for astronomy (jyotiḥśāstra). He utilized the methods of the Mīmāṃsā school of Indian philosophy to justfy continuous obervational verification (parīkṣā) instead of dogmatic traditional adherence.

== Works ==
The following is a brief description of the works by Nilakantha Somayaji dealing with astronomy and mathematics.

1. Tantrasamgraha
2. Golasara : Description of basic astronomical elements and procedures
3. Sidhhantadarpana : A short work in 32 slokas enunciating the astronomical constants with reference to the Kalpa and specifying his views on astronomical concepts and topics.
4. Candrachayaganita : A work in 32 verses on the methods for the calculation of time from the measurement of the shadow of the gnomon cast by the moon and vice versa.
5. Aryabhatiya-bhashya : Elaborate commentary on Aryabhatiya.
6. Sidhhantadarpana-vyakhya : Commentary on his own Siddhantadarapana.
7. Chandrachhayaganita-vyakhya : Commentary on his own Chandrachhayaganita.
8. Sundaraja-prasnottara : Nilakantha's answers to questions posed by Sundaraja, a Tamil Nadu-based astronomer.
9. Grahanadi-grantha : Rationale of the necessity of correcting old astronomical constants by observations.
10. Grahapariksakrama : Description of the principles and methods for verifying astronomical computations by regular observations.
11. Jyotirmimamsa : Analysis of astronomy

== See also ==
- Indian mathematicians
- Indian astronomy
- List of astronomers and mathematicians of the Kerala school
