= Trithala Maha Siva Temple =

Hindu temple in Kerala, India

- തൃത്താല മഹാ ശിവക്ഷേത്രം
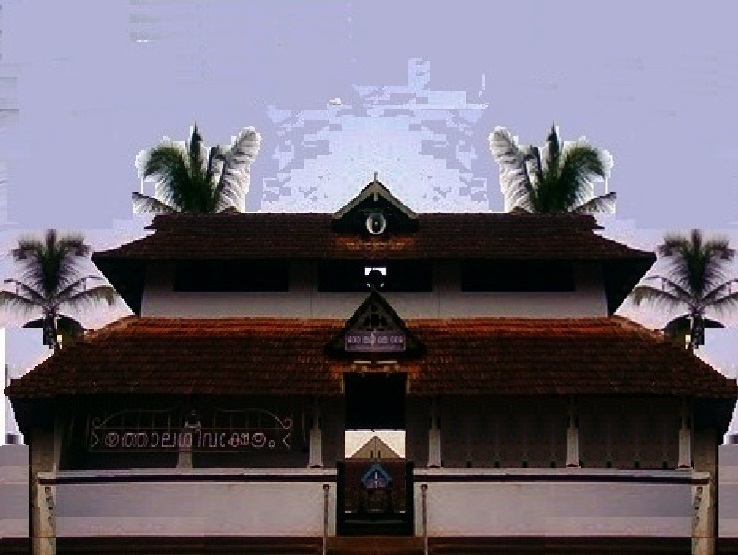
- Temple Tower

- Maha Siva Temple, Thrithala, Palakkad, Kerala

Religion
- Affiliation: Hinduism
- District: Palakkad
- Deity: Shiva
- Festival: Maha Shivaratri

Location
- Location: Trithala
- State: Kerala
- Country: India
- Coordinates: 10.805172°N 76.132518°E

Architecture
- Type: Architecture of Chola or Pandya style
- Completed: 9th Century

Specifications
- Temple: 1
- Elevation: 37.34 m (123 ft)

Trithala Maha Siva Temple (Malayalam: തൃത്താല മഹാ ശിവക്ഷേത്രം) is an ancient Hindu temple dedicated to Lord Shiva is situated on the banks of the Bharathappuzha river at Thrithala of Palakkad District in Kerala state in India. References to this temple are found in Aithihyamala of Kottarathil Sankunni and many classics of Malayalam Literature. The place where the idol is worshiped in the temple resembles the addition of sand. Legend has it that the Shiva Linga was made by Mezhathol Agnihothri by using the sand from Bharathapuzha river. Anointing is not performed because it is a Shivling of sand. The Shivalinga sits slightly oblique, as the mother of Agnihotri held on to the force, there was a slight tilt. The temple is a part of the 108 famous Shiva temples in Kerala. According to historians, the Trithala Siva Temple, built in the 9th or 10th century, marks the transition from Chola to Pandya style architecture.

== History ==
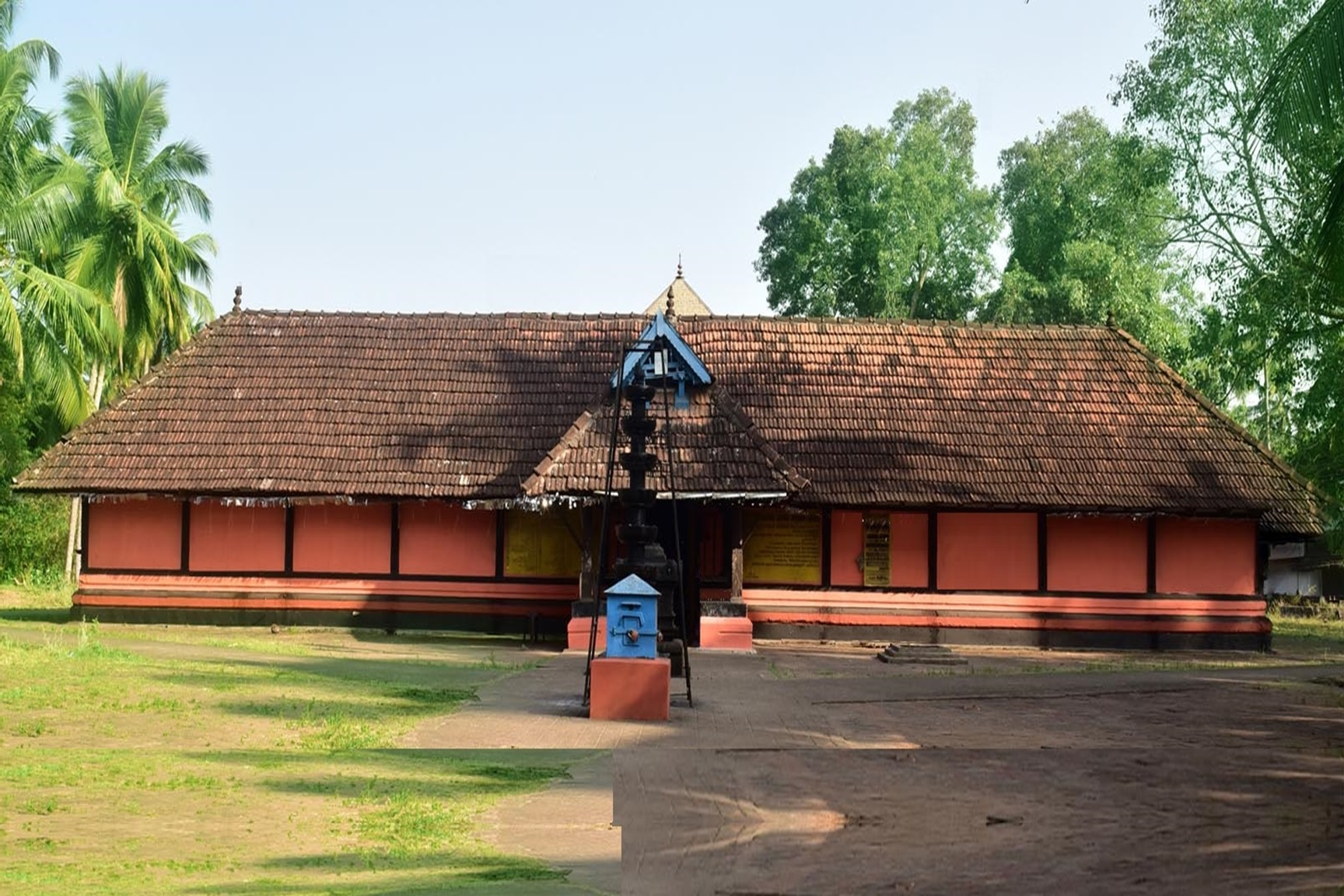
Siva Temple Nalambalam

Trithala Maha Siva temple, probably built during the 9th and 10th century, marks the transition from the Chola to the Pandya style of temple architecture.

== The Legend ==
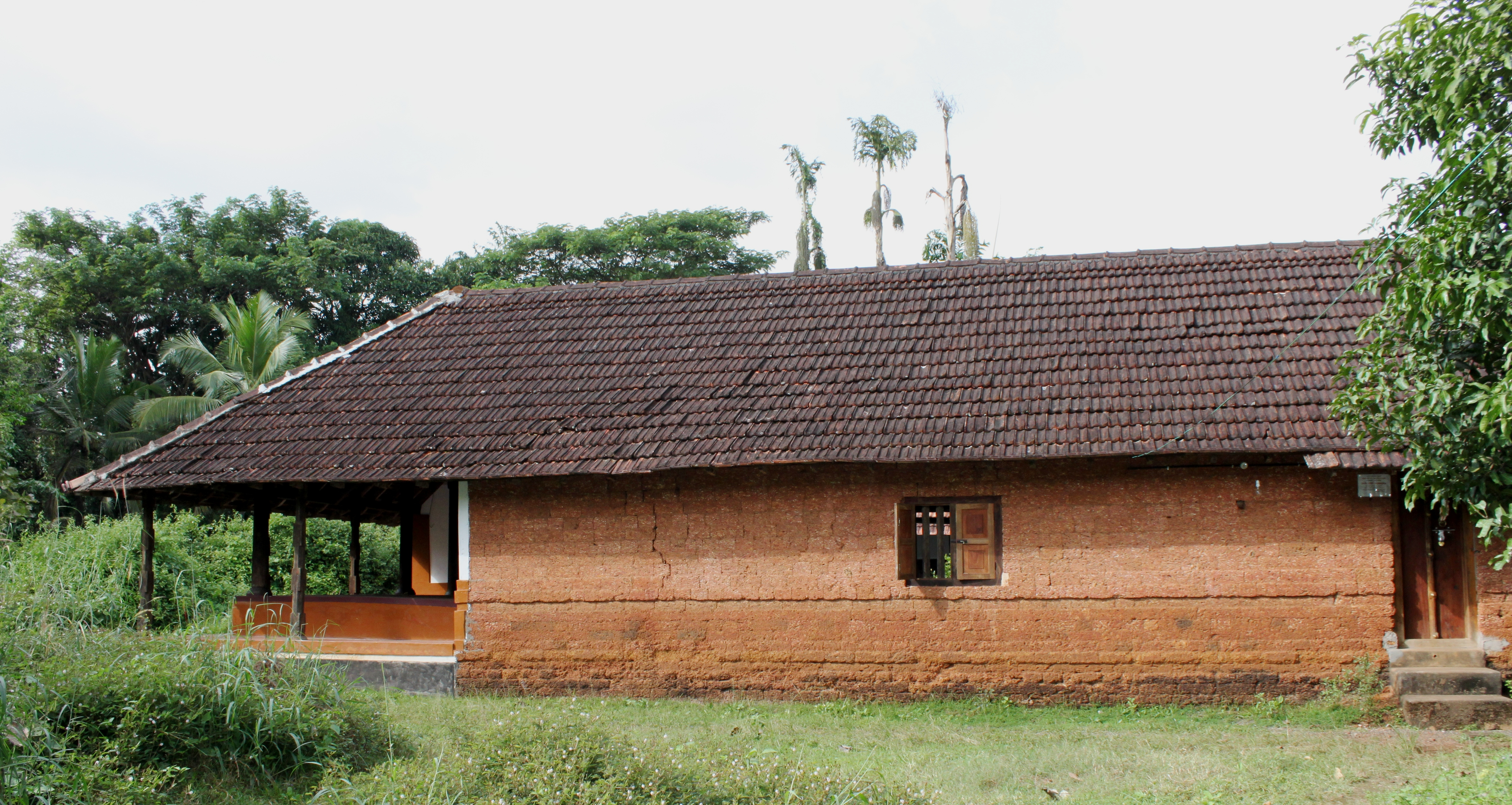
Vemancheri Mana of Agnihotri

The legend of 'Parayi petta panthirukulam' is centered on Trithala. According to this legend, a Brahmin named Vararuchi, married a lower caste woman named Panchami. After the marriage, they set out on a long journey. During the course of the journey, the Panchami became pregnant several times, and every time she delivered a baby, the husband asked her to leave it there itself. Each of the babies was taken up by people of different castes (totally 12), thus they grew up in that caste, making the legendary 'Panthirukulam'. They all became famous in their lives and many tales are attributed to them. The eldest was Brahmadathan Agnihothri, a Brahmin, whose place is Mezhathur in Trithala. The others are Pakkanar (Basket weaver), Rajaka (Laundry man), Karakkal Matha (The only female member), Akavur Chathan, Vaduthala Nair (Kshatriya/Warrior), Thiruvalluvar (Philosopher), Uppukuttan (a Muslim), Pananar (a Panar), (Perumthachan (Master carpenter), Naranathu Bhranthan (an eccentric but divine person), Vayillakunnilappan (a child without mouth, whom the mother wanted to keep with her). Their stories are mentioned in the well known book 'Eithihyamala' by Kottarathil Sankunni.

== Architecture ==
Trithala is an important archaeological place in Kerala. Trithala Siva is located on the southern bank of Bharathapuzha river, about 75 km from the Palakkad. The most striking feature of the temple is that it is still preserved as the oldest archaeological site in Kerala. The Trithala and Siva Temple is known for its ruins and historical monuments that date back to the ninth or early 10th centuries.
