= Pakkanar =

Malayalam folklore character

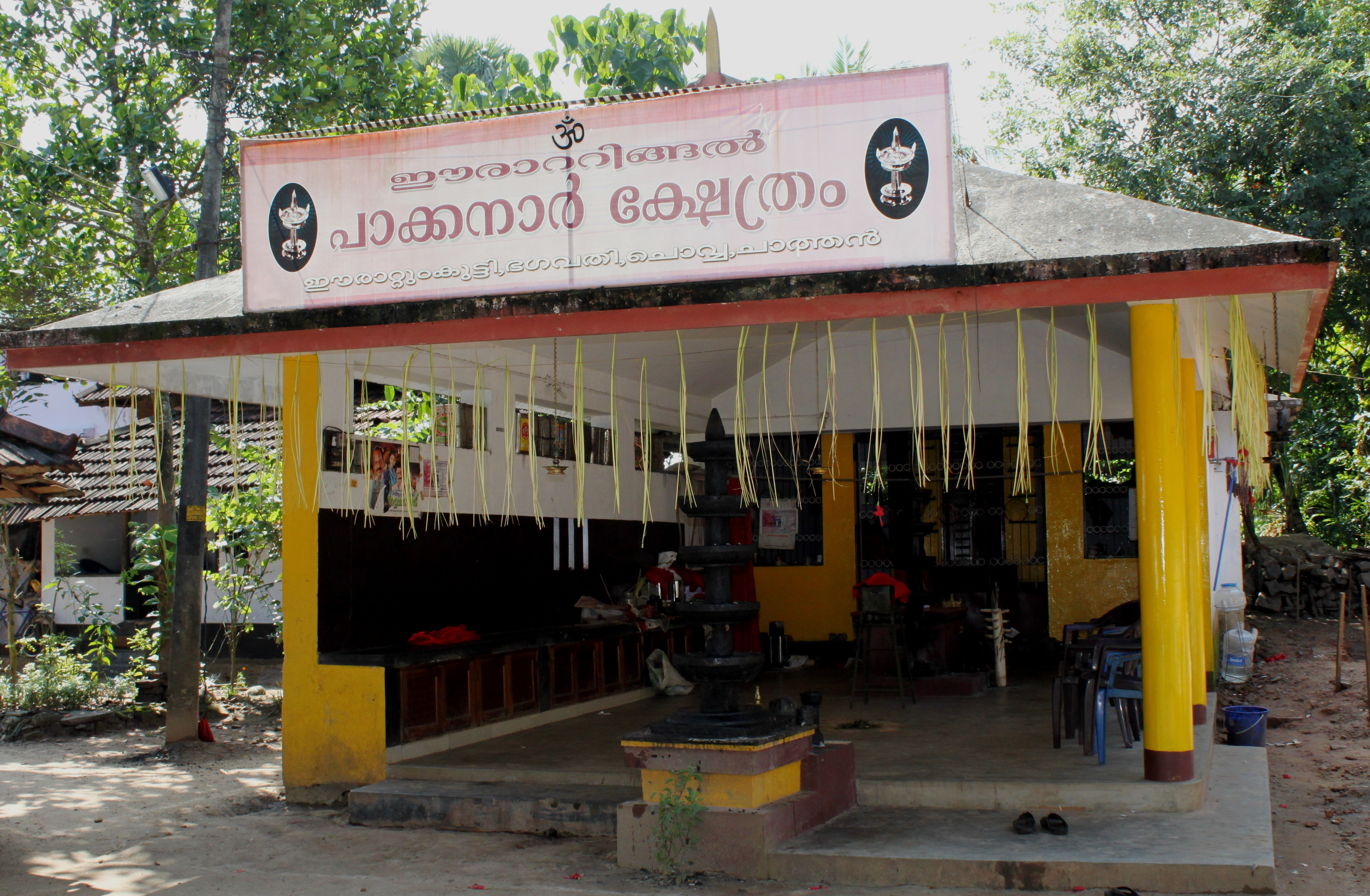

Pakkanar is a character in Malayalam Folklore. Pakkanar was born as the son of Vararuchi, the famous astrologer who adorned the court of King Vikramaditya. Pakkanar was second among the twelve offspring or the Parayi petta panthirukulam (12 children born from the Pariah woman). Just a shout away from Mezhathol Agnihothri's home Vemancheri Mana in Thrithala, is the Paakkanar colony otherwise known as Eerattinkal Paraya colony adjoining Arikkunnu mentioned earlier. In the traditional caste hierarchy in Kerala, the Paraya caste was considered a lower caste. Families of Paakkanaar lineage live in this colony in 18 houses. The story goes that it was Paakkanar who actually made a "Thampraakkal" out of "Azhvanchery Thamprakkal", who is considered as the head of the Namboothiris of the region.

== Stories of Pakkanar ==
Aithihyamaala by Kottarathil Sankunny says many stories of Pakkanar. According to one story Pakkanar made only 4 "Muram" (A traditional south Indian board used to separate the chaff from the rice). Pakkanar would sell 4 of them. He says "One for giving credits (for his kids to whom he provides everything for sustaining them), One for paying off debts (To help his grandparents who made him what he is), One for himself and his wife, and the last one he just throws away (That is for charity without expecting returns)." The stories of Aithihyamala depicts such valuable messages of life through simple stories of miracles of the Parayi petta panthirukulam (12 children born from the Pariah woman). A festival of "Muram" is conducted still today in Bhuvaneswari temple. In other story Agnihotri, Pakkanar's elder brother, and his wife visits Pakkanar's home. Agnihotri's wife is depicted as an orthodox upper caste woman. As the visitors arrived Pakkanar called his wife, who was taking water from well. The woman left the rope and ran to attend her husband, but the bucket stayed in the air where it was. Such is said to be the power of purity and respect that she showed to Pakkanar.

== See also ==
Parayi petta panthirukulam
