= Nedungottur =

Village in Kerala, India

Coordinates: 11°17′N 75°48′E

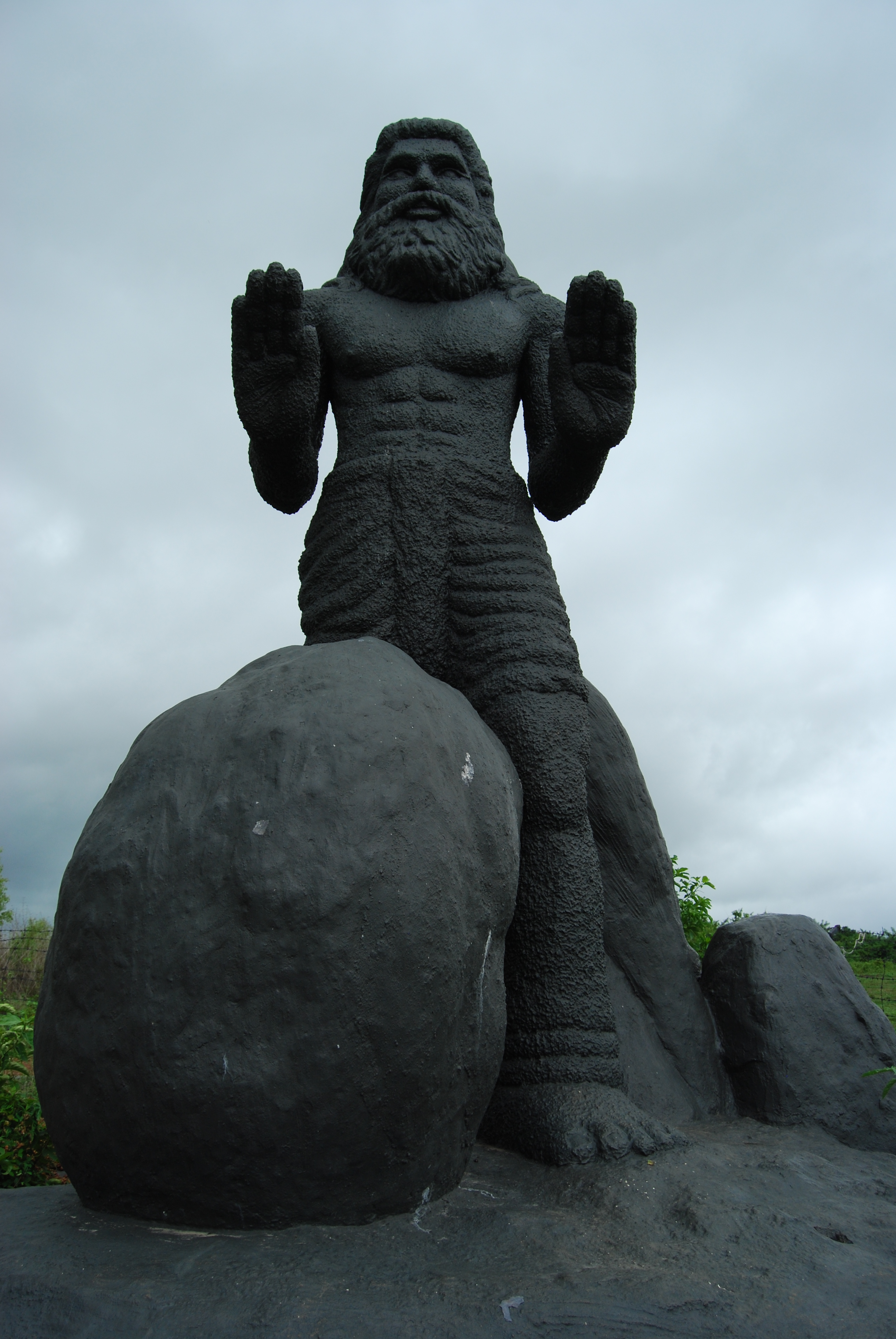
The mythical charactaer of Naranath Bhranthan

Nedungottur is a small village located in Pattambi western part of Palakkad District, in the state of Kerala. Situated along the bank of the river Kunthipuzha (Thoothappuzha). It is divided into the Palakkad and Malappuram Districts. Nedungottur is a special grade ward in Thiruvegappura Panchayath. Flora Fantasia Park is situated on the opposite of side of the Kunthipuzha.

== Geography ==
Situated in the bank of river Thutha (Also known as Kundhi), the east end of the village is Edallapalm and towards the south and west end is Kaippuram. Nedungottur is situated in the Thiruvegappura Grama Panchayath, Pattambi constituency, and Pattambi Taluk in Palakkad District.

== Naranath Bhranthan ==
Nedungottur is famous for Kaippuram village where the hill of Naranath Bhranthan attracts visitors who want to remember the antics of the madman in the Malayalam classics.
