= Chinthamani Ragoonatha Chary =

Indian astronomer

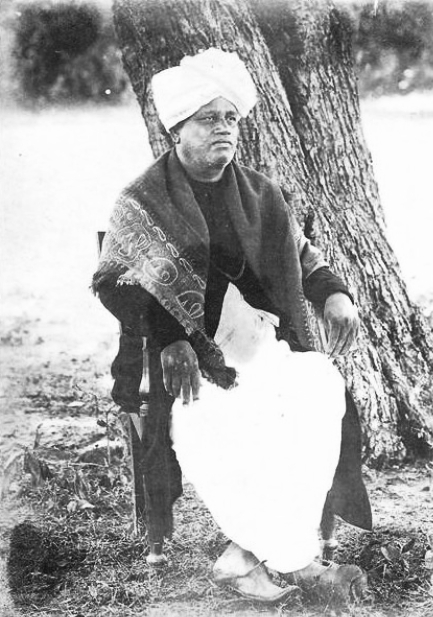
- Born: 1822 or 1828; Madras, British India
- Died: 5 February 1880; Madras, British India
- Occupation: astronomer
- Employer: Madras Observatory
- Known for: discovery of variable star R Reticuli

Chinthamani Ragoonatha Chary (1822 or "17 March" 1828 – 5 February 1880) was an Indian astronomer who worked at the Madras Observatory along with N.R. Pogson. He was the first Indian Fellow of the Royal Astronomical Society and is known for his studies of variable stars and the discovery of R Reticuli in 1867.

== Early life ==
Little is known about Chary's personal life. It is believed that he was born in Madras in about 1822. However, in official records, his birthdate has been recorded as 1828 and given in some sources as 17 March. Chary's ancestors were Hindu astronomers who prepared Hindu astrological almanacs called Panchangams. He lived in Nungambakkam and joined the Madras Observatory in 1840 as a "coolie" under Thomas Glanville Taylor.

== Career ==
By 1864, Chary had gathered enough knowledge of mathematics to be appointed as astronomer at the observatory. He forged a productive partnership with N. R. Pogson, director of the Madras observatory. His main responsibility at the observatory was to observe stars and determine their positions for the Madras Catalogues.

During the solar eclipse of 18 August 1868, Chary was given the task of conducting observations from a village called Wanaparthy situated to the north of Kurnool, in the district of Mehaboobnagar. He was also a part of the team which observed the eclipse of 12 December 1871 at Avanashi. In 1874, Chary wrote a treatise on the transit of Venus which was published in several local languages.

== Discoveries ==
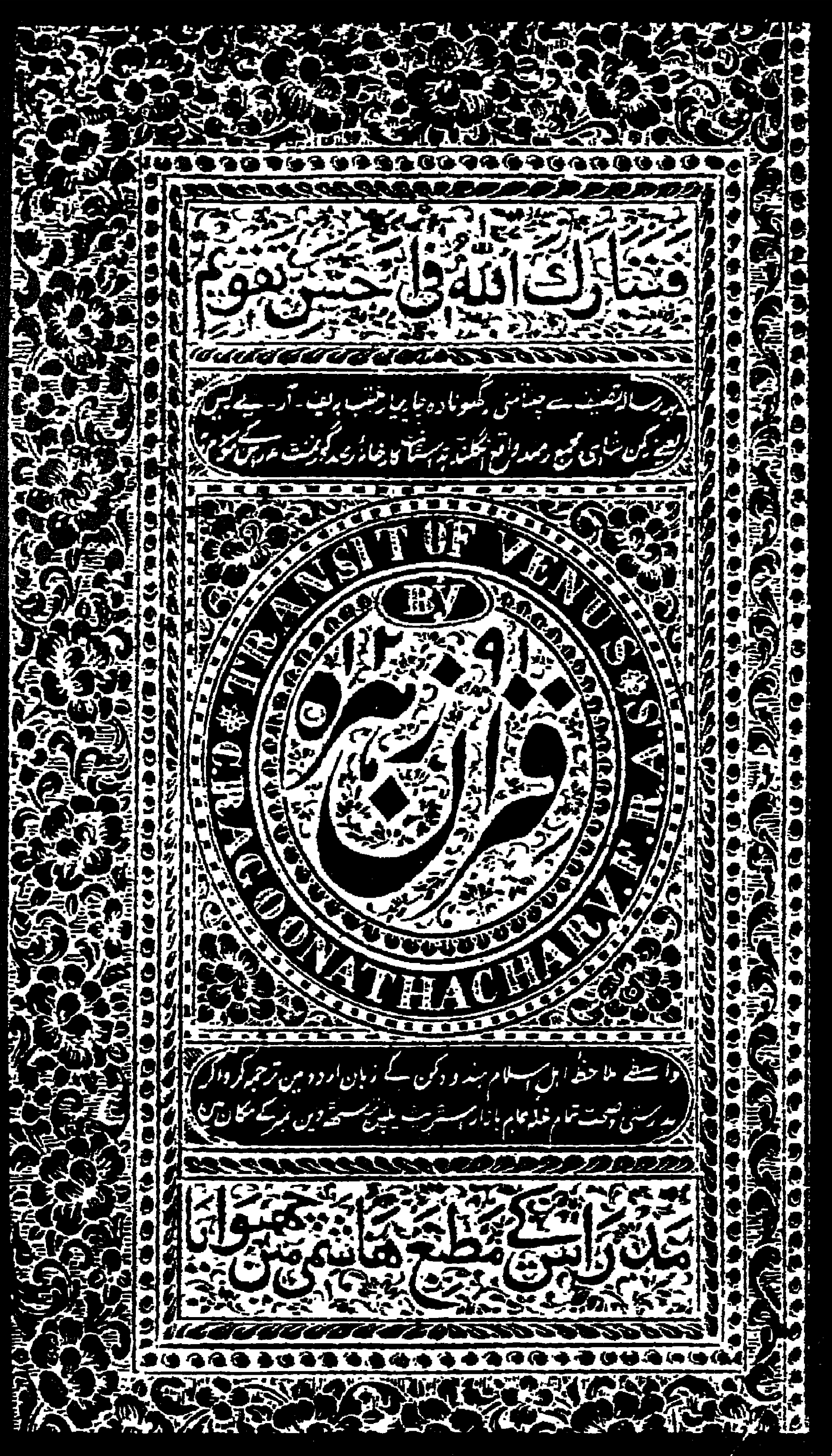
Urdu translation on the transit of Venus (1874)

Chary discovered the variable star R Reticuli in 1867. He was the first Indian in modern history to make a significant astronomical discovery. Chary noted that the star which was observed by astronomer T. Moottooswamy Pillai with a Meridian Circle on 9 February 1864 was not visible when observed in January 1866 but could be spotted on 18 January 1867.

Some sources also attribute the discovery of another variable star V Cephei or U Cephei to him but same has not been confirmed by the Madras Observatory.

== Death ==
Chary fell ill and died on 5 February 1880. In an obituary to Chary, The Madras Mail wrote

His... ready skill as an observer, combined with accuracy and speed in computation, and a fair and useful amount of self-acquired mathematical knowledge, rendered him, until disabled by impaired health, invaluable in the Observatory, and the chief share in the catalogue of stars in hand, with the Transit Circle, since 1862, comprising already of over 38,000 separate observations, is due to his personal exertions.

== Family ==
One of Chary's sons Chinthamani Raghava Chary was also an astronomer and helped Chary in preparing a Drigganita Panchang for the year 1880. One of Chary's relatives P. Raghavachari served as third assistant at the Madras Observatory in 1877.

== Honours ==
Chary was elected fellow of the Royal Astronomical Society on 12 January 1872 - the first Indian to be elected to the society.

== Publications ==
Chary had three papers published in the Monthly Notices of the Royal Astronomical Society (all before his election to the Society)

Volume 19 (1859), p. 337, On the Determination of Personal Equation by Observations of the Projected Image of the Sun. (letter to W S Jacob (Madras Observatory Director, 1848-1859))

Volume 28 (1867), p. 193, Occultations visible in the Month of August, 1868, at Madras, and along the Shadow Path of the Total Eclipse of the Sun in India. (communicated by N R Pogson)

Volume 31 (1871), p. 137, On the Total Eclipse of the Sun, on December the 11th, 1871, as visible in the Madras Presideency. (communicated by N R Pogson)

In 1874, Chary wrote a book on the transit of Venus in English and six Indian languages, Sanskrit, Kannada, Tamil, Telugu and Urdu in the form of a vivada or dialogue between two individuals.

== See also ==
- Drigganita
- Vākyapañcāṅga
- Tirugaṇita-pañcāṅgam

== See also ==
- Indian astronomy
- Visvanatha Sastriyar
