= Vararuchi =

Indian mathematician and linguist

Vararuci (also transliterated as Vararuchi) (Devanagari: वररुचि) is a name associated with several literary and scientific texts in Sanskrit and also with various legends in several parts of India. This Vararuci is often identified with Kātyāyana. Kātyāyana is the author of Vārtikās which is an elaboration of certain sūtrās (rules or aphorisms) in Pāṇini's much revered treatise on Sanskrit grammar titled Aṣṭādhyāyī. Kātyāyana is believed to have flourished in the 3rd century BCE. However, this identification of Vararuci with Kātyāyana has not been fully accepted by scholars. Vararuci is believed to be the author of Prākrita Prakāśa, the oldest treatise on the grammar of Prākrit language. Vararuci's name appears in a verse listing the 'nine gems' (navaratnas) in the court of one Vikramaditya. Vararuci appears as a prominent character in Kathasaritsagara ("ocean of the streams of stories"), a famous 11th century collection of Indian legends, fairy tales and folk tales as retold by Somadeva.

The Aithihyamala of Kottarathil Shankunni states that Vararuchi was the son of Govinda Swami i.e. Govinda Bhagavatpada. It also states that King Vikramaditya, Bhatti (the minister of King Vikramaditya) and Bharthari were his brothers. Vararuci is the father figure in a legend in Kerala popularly referred to as the legend of the twelve clans born of a pariah woman (Parayi petta panthirukulam). The Vararuci of Kerala legend was also an astute astronomer believed to be the author of Chandravākyas (moon sentences), a set of numbers specifying the longitudes of the Moon at different intervals of time. These numbers are coded in the katapayādi system of numeration and it is believed that Vararuci himself was the inventor of this system of numeration. The eldest son of Vararuci of Kerala legend is known as Mezhathol Agnihothri and he is supposed to have lived between 343 and 378 CE.

The name Vararuchi is associated with more than a dozen works in Sanskrit, and the name Katyayana is associated with about sixteen works. There are around ten works connected with astronomy and mathematics associated with the name of Vararuci.

== Vararuci, the astronomer ==
Possibly there are at least three persons named Vararuci in the astronomical tradition of South India.

=== Vararuci (Kerala, fourth century CE) ===
This Vararuchi is the father figure in the astronomical tradition of Kerala. He is also the father figure in the legend of the twelve clans born of the Pariah woman. The eldest son of this Vararuci, the establisher of the first of the twelve clans, was one Mezhattol Agnihotri and he is supposed to have lived between 343 and 378 CE. Based on this, Vararuci is supposed to have lived in the first half of the 4th century CE. The manuscript tradition of Kerala ascribes to Vararuci the authorship of Chandravākyās (moon sentences) which is a set of 248 numbers for calculating the position of the sun and moon. This work is also known by the name Vararuci-Vākyās. Vararuci is also believed to be the originator of the Katapayadi notation of depicting numbers, which has been used in the formulation of Chandravākyās.

=== Vararuci (Kerala, 13th century CE) ===
This astronomer is the author of the well-known Vākyakaraṇa, which is the source book of the Vākya Panchānga, popular in South India, . This Vararuchi belonged to the Kerala region, as is clear from the introductory verses of the work. It has been shown that this treatise was originally produced around 1282 CE. The treatise is also known as Vākyapañcādhyāyī and is based on the works of Haridatta (c. 650 CE) of Kerala. Sundararaja, an astronomer from Tamil Nadu contemporaneous with Nilakantha Somayaji, has composed a commentary on Vākyakarana and the commentary contains several references to Vararuci. In five chapters Vākyakaraṇa deals with all aspects of astronomy required for the preparation of the Hindu almanac. Chapter I is concerned with the computation of the sun, the moon and the moon's nodes, Chapter II with that of the planets. Chapter III is devoted to problems involving time, position and direction and other preliminaries like the precession of the equinoxes. Chapter IV deals with the computation of the lunar and solar eclipses. Chapter V is devoted to computation of the conjunction of the planets and of the planets and stars.

=== Vararuci (several persons) ===
Many texts have been ascribed to Vararuci, such as Kerala-Vararuchi-Vakya, Kerala-Vararuchi-proktha, Kerala-dvādaśa-bhāva-vākyāni, Vararuchi-Kerala, Bhārgava-pañcāṅga etc. The Vararuchi, who is the author of the above works on astrology might be identical to Vararuchi of Kerala, but it is not possible to assert that he is the same as the author of the Chandra-Vākyās.

== Vararuci, the grammarian ==
=== The author of Vartikas ===
In ancient India, grammar was the first and most important of all sciences. When one had first studied grammar, he could go in for learning any other science. This historical mindset justifies the great respect and prestige attributed to the ancient grammarians of India like Pāṇini and Patanjali. Pāṇini was an ancient Indian Sanskrit grammarian from Pushkalavati, Gandhara (fl. 4th century BCE). He is known for his Sanskrit grammar text known as Aṣṭādhyāyī (meaning 'eight chapters'). The Ashtadhyayi is one of the earliest known grammars of Sanskrit. After Pāṇini, the Mahābhāṣya ('great commentary') of Patañjali on the Ashtadhyayi is one of the three most famous works in Sanskrit grammar. It was with Patañjali that Indian linguistic science reached its definite form. Kātyāyana (c. 3rd century BCE) was a Sanskrit grammarian, mathematician and Vedic priest who lived in ancient India. He is known as the author of the Varttika, an elaboration on Pāṇini grammar. Along with the Mahābhāsya of Patañjali, this text became a core part of the vyākarana (grammar) canon. (A vārttika is defined as a single remark or a whole work attempting to present a detailed commentary.) In many accounts Katyayana has been referred to as Vararuci. Kātyāyana's Vārtikās correct, supplement, eliminate as unnecessary, or justify the rules of Pāṇini. In his Vajasaneyi Pratisakhya, he subjected about 1500 sutras of Panini to critical observations.

=== A Prākṛt grammarian ===
The term Prākṛt or Prakrit denotes a multitude of languages all originated from Sanskrit. They are all considered as derived from Sanskrit and developed by adopting deviations and by corruption. Indian languages including those in the south are considered Prakrut in Indian classification. There is now no complete agreement on what languages are to be included in this group. Prakrit is also closely connected with the development of Buddhist and Jaina philosophical thought.

Vararuci is the name of the author of the oldest extant grammar of Prakrit, titled Prākṛt Prakāśa. In this work Vararuci has considered four different dialects: Maharashtri, the older form of Marathi; Sauraseni, which evolved into the Braj language; Magadhi, the former form of Bihari; and Paisaci, a language no longer extant. The book is divided into twelve chapters. The first nine chapters containing a total of 424 rules are devoted to Maharashtri and of the remaining three chapters, one each is devoted to Paisaci with 14 rules, Māgadhi with 17 rules, and Sauraseni with 32 rules respectively.

The author of Prakrita Prakasa was also known by the name Katyayana, perhaps the gotra name of Vararuci. This gotra name was given to him by the unknown author of a commentary of Prakrita Prakasa named Prakritamanjari. In Somadeva's Kathasaritsagara and Kshemendra's Brihatkathamanjari one can see that Katyayana was called Vararuci. The oldest commentator of Prakrita Prakasa was Bhamaha an inhabitant of Kashmir who was also a rhetorician as well as a poet.

== Vararuci Śulbasūtras ==
The Śulbasūtras are appendices to the Vedas which give rules for constructing altars. They are the only sources of knowledge of Indian mathematics from the Vedic period. There are several Śulbasūtras. The most important of these are the Baudhayana Śulbasūtra, written about 800 BCE; the Apastamba Śulbasūtra, written about 600 BCE; Manava Śulbasūtra, written about 750 BCE; and the Katyayana Śulbasūtra, written about 200 BCE. Since Katyayana has been identified with one Vararuci, possibly the author of the Vartikas, Katyayana Śulbasūtra is referred to as Vararuci Śulbasūtra also.

== Vararuci, the littérateur ==
Vararuci was also a legendary figure in the Indian literary tradition.

=== Author of Ubhayabhisarika ===
Though littérateur Vararuci is recorded to have composed several Kavyas, only one complete work is currently extant. This is a satirical monologue titled Ubhayabhisarika. The work titled Ubhayabhisarika (The mutual elopement) appears in a collection of four monologues titled Chaturbhani, the other monologues in the collection being Padma-prabhritaka (The lotus gift) by Shudraka, Dhurta-vita-samvada (Rogue and pimp confer) by Isvaradatta and Padataditaka (The kick) by Shyamalika. The collection along with an English translation has been published in Clay Sanskrit Library under the title The Quartet of Causeries. Ubhayabhisarika is set in Pataliputra and it is dated to somewhere between the 1st century BCE and 2nd century CE. It might be the earliest Indian play extant. Some scholars are of the opinion that the work was composed in the 5th century CE.

=== Other works ===
He is also said to have written two kavyas by names Kanthabharana (The necklace) and Charumati. There are several verses ascribed to Vararuci appearing in different literary works. Other works attributed to Vararuci are: Nitiratna, a book with didactic contents; Niruktasamuccaya, a commentary on the Nirukta of Yaska; Pushpasutra, a Pratishakhya of the Samaveda; a lexicon; and, an alamkara work.

== Vararuci, a 'gem' in the court of Samrat Vikramaditya ==
Vararuci's name appears in a Sanskrit verse specifying the names of the 'nine gems' (navaratnas) in the court of the legendary Samrat Vikramaditya who is said to have founded the Vikrama era in 57 BCE. This verse appears in Jyotirvidabharana, which is supposed to be a work of the great Kalidasa but is in fact a late forgery. This verse appears in the last chapter (Sloka 20 : Chapter XXII) of Jyotirvidabharana. That the great Kalidasa is the author of Jyotirvidabharana is difficult to believe because Varahamihira, one of the nine gems listed in the verse, in his Pancasiddhantika refers to Aryabhata, who was born in 476 CE and wrote his Aryabhatiya in 499 CE or a little later. Jyotirvidabharana is a later work of about 12th century CE. There might have been a very respected Vararuci in the court of one King Vikrama, but the identities of the particular Vararuci and the King Vikrama are uncertain.

The names of the nine gems are found in the following Sanskrit verse:

dhanvantarikṣapaṇakāmarasiṃhaśaṅku
vetālabhaṭṭa ghaṭakarpara kālidāsāḥ |
khyāto varāhamihiro nṛpate sabhāyāṃ
ratnāni vai vararucirnava vikramasya ||

The names of the nine gems and their traditional claims to fame are the following:

- Dhanvantari, a medical practitioner
- Kshapanaka, probably Siddhasena, a Jain monk, author of Dvatrishatikas
- Amarasimha, author of Amarakosha, a thesaurus of Sanskrit
- Sanku (little known)
- Vetalabhatta, a Maga Brahmin known as the author of the sixteen stanza Niti-pradeepa (The Lamp of Conduct) in tribute to Vikramaditya
- Ghatakarpara, author of Ghatakarpara-kavya, in which a wife sends a message (reverse of Meghaduta)
- Kalidasa, a renowned classical Sanskrit writer, widely regarded as the greatest poet and dramatist in the Sanskrit language
- Varahamihira, astrologer & astronomer
- Vararuchi, poet & grammarian

== Vararuci of Kerala legends ==
There are several versions of these legends.

One of these versions is given in Castes and tribes of Southern India by Edgar Thurston. This seven volume work is a systematic and detailed account of more than 300 castes and tribes in the erstwhile Madras Presidency and the states of Travancore and Cochin. It was originally published in 1909. The Vararuci legend is given in Volume 1 (pp. 120 – 125) in the discussion on the Paraiyan caste. Thurston has recorded that the discussion is based on a note prepared by L.K. Anantha Krishna Aiyar.

A slight variant of the legend can be seen in Aithihyamala by Kottarathil Sankunny (1855–1937). This work originally written in Malayalam and published as a series of pamphlets during the years 1909 – 1934 is a definitive source of myths and legends of Kerala. (An English language translation of the work has recently been published under the title Lore and Legends of Kerala.) The story of Vararuci is given in the narration of the legend of Parayi petta panthirukulam.

=== Legend as per Castes and tribes of Southern India ===
In these legends, Vararuchi, a son of a Brahmin named Chandragupta and his Brahmin wife who was an astute astrologer, became king of Avanti and ruled until Vikramāditya, son of Chandragupta by his Kṣatriya wife came of age and the king abdicated in his favor. Once when he was resting under an aśvastha (ficus religiosa) tree he happened to overhear a conversation between two Gandharvās on the tree to the effect that he would marry a certain, just then born, paraiya girl. This he tried to prevent by arranging, with the help of the king, to have the girl enclosed in a box and floated down a river with a nail stuck into her head.

After floating down the river through a long distance, the box came into the hands of a Brāhman who was bathing in the river. Finding a beautiful and charming little girl inside the box and accepting it as a divine gift he adopted her as his own daughter and helped her groom up accordingly. Vararuci in his travels happened to pass by the house of this Brāhman and the Brāhman invited him to lunch with him. Vararuci accepted the invitation on condition that the Brāhman had to prepare eighteen curries and would give him what remained after feeding a hundred other Brāhmans. The host was puzzled. But his adopted daughter was unfazed. She placed a long plantain leaf in front of Vararuci and served a preparation using ginger (symbolically corresponding to eighteen curries) and some rice which had been used an offering at the Vaisvadeva ceremony (symbolically equivalent to feeding a hundred a Brāhmans). Knowing this to be the work of the host's daughter and fully convinced of her superior intellect Vararuci expressed his desire to marry her. The desire was acceded to by the Brāhman.

Days passed. One day while conversing with his wife about their past lives he accidentally saw a nail stuck in her head and he immediately knew her to be the girl whom he caused to be floated down a river. He realised the impossibility of altering one's fate and resolved to go on a pilgrimage with his wife bathing in rivers and worshiping at temples.

At the end of these pilgrimages they reached Kerala and while in Kerala the woman bore him twelve children. All these children, except one, were abandoned on the wayside and were picked up members of different castes and were brought up according to the customs and traditions of those castes. They were all remarkable for their wisdom, gifted with the power of performing miracles, and were all believed to incarnations of Viṣṇu. These children are known by the names:

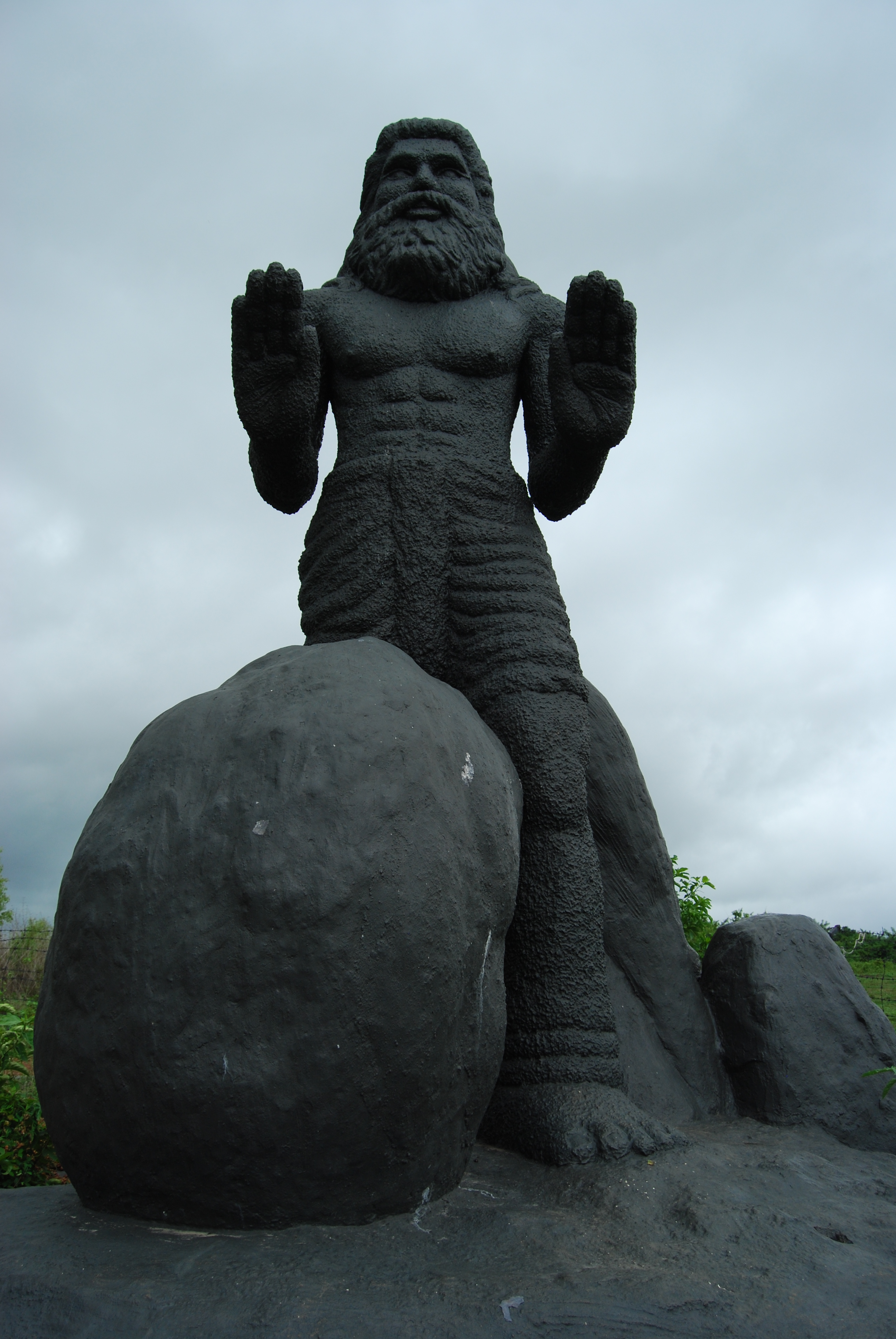
Statue of Nārānat Bhrāntan (The madman of Nārāṇatt), one of the twelve children of Vararuci of Kerala legends.

- Mezhathol Agnihotri (a Brāhman who had performed Yajñam or Yāgam ninety-nine times)
- Pākkanār (a Paraiya, bamboo basket maker by profession),
- Perumtaccan (a master carpenter and an expert in Vāsthu)
- Rajakan (a sage and a learned man raised by a washerman)
- Vallon (a Paraiya, sometimes identified with the Tamil saint Thiruvalluvar who composed Thirukkural),
- Vaduthala Nair (a Kshathriya, an expert in martial arts)
- Uppukootan (a Muslim, a trader in salt and cotton)
- Akavūr Cāttan (a Vysya, a manager of Akavur Mana)
- Kārakkal Amma (Kṣatriya woman, the only girl of the twelve children)
- Pānanār (a Pānan, a singer in Thiruvarangu)
- Nārānat Bhrāntan (a Brahman, also called the madman of Nārāṇatt)
- Vāyillākunnilappan (not adopted by anybody, deified as the god of silence sanctified on the top of a hill).

There are several legends about these children of Vararuci. In one such legend, Pākkanār tries to dissuade a group of Brāhmans who had resolved to go to Benares from so doing, by telling them that the journey to the sacred city would not be of productive of salvation. To prove the fruitlessness of the journey, he plucked a lotus flower from a stagnant pool and gave it to the Brāhmans and instructed them to give it to a hand which would rise from the Ganges and to say that it was a present for Goddess Ganga from Pākkanār. They did as directed and returned with news of the miracle. Pākkanār then led them to a stagnant pool and said: "Please return the lotus flower, Oh! Ganga!". According to the legend, the same lotus flower instantly appeared in his hand.

=== Legend as per Aithihyamala ===
There is another legend regarding the circumstances leading to Vararuci's arrival in Kerala. In this legend, Vararuci appears as a very learned scholar in the court of Vikramaditya. Once King Vikramaditya asked Vararuci to tell him about the most important verses in the whole of Valmiki's Ramayana. Since Vararuci could not give an immediate answer, the King granted him 40 days to find out the same and to report back to the king. If he were unable to find the correct answer, he would be required to leave the court. Vararuci left the court in search of an answer and during his wanderings, on the last night of the stipulated period, Vararuci happened to rest under a tree. While half awake and half asleep Vararuci happened to overhear a conversation of the Vanadevatas resting on the tree regarding the fate of a newly born Paraiah infant girl to whom he would be wedded while they were talking about the poor Brāhman who does not know that the verses beginning with "māṃ viddhi.." as the most important verse in Ramayana . Vararuci most pleased with his discovery returned to the court and told the king the surprising answer. The king was very pleased and Vararuci prevailed upon Vikramiditya to destroy all pariah infant girls recently born in a certain locality. The girl was not killed instead was floated down a river with a nail stuck through the heads. The rest of the legend is as described in the first version of the legend.

== Vararuci of Kathasaritsagara ==
Kathasaritsagara ('ocean of the streams of stories') is a famous 11th century collection of Indian legends, fairy tales and folk tales as retold by a Saivite Brahmin named Somadeva. Nothing is known about the author other than that his father's name was Ramadevabatta. The work was compiled for the entertainment of the queen Suryamati, wife of king Anantadeva of Kashmir (r. 1063–81). It consists of 18 books of 124 chapters and more than 21,000 verses in addition to prose sections. Vararuchi's story is told in great detail in the first four chapters of this great collection of stories. The following is a very brief account of some of the main events in the life of Vararuchi as told in this classic. It emphasises the divine ancestry and magical powers of Vararuchi.

Once Pārvati pleaded with Shiva to tell her a story nobody had heard before. After much persuasions Shiva agreed and narrated the story of Vidyadharas. To ensure that nobody else would hear the story, Parvati had ordered that nobody be allowed to enter the place where they were and Nandi (The Vehicle of Lord Shiva) kept guard at the door. While Shiva was thus speaking to his consort in private thus, Pushpadanta, one of Shiva's trusted attendants, a member of his gana, appeared at the door. Having denied entry and overcame by curiosity, Pushpadanta summoned his special powers to move about unseen and entered the chamber of Shiva and eavesdropped the entire story as told by Shiva. Pushpadanta then narrated the entire story to his wife Jaya and Jaya retold the same to Parvati! Parvati became enraged and told Shiva: "Thou didst tell me any extraordinary tale, for Jaya knows it also." Shiva, due to his meditational powers, immediately knew the truth and told Parvati of the role of Pushpadanta in leaking the story to Jaya. Having heard this, Parvati became exceedingly enraged and cursed Pushpadanta to be mortal. Then he together with Jaya fell at Parvati's feet and entreated her to say when the curse would end. "A Yaksha named Supratîka, who has been made a Pisacha by the curse of Kuvera, is residing in the Vindhya forest under the name of Kāṇabhūti. When thou shalt see him, and calling to mind thy origin, tell him this tale; then thou shalt be released from this curse."

Pushpadanta was born as a mortal under the name of Vararuchi in the city called Kausāṃbi. Somadatta, a Brāhman, was his father, and Vasudatta his mother. Vararuchi was also known as Kātyāyana. At the time of his birth there was a heavenly pronouncement that he would be known as Varauchi because of his interest (ruchi) in the best (vara) things. It was also pronounced that he would be a world-renowned authority on grammar. Vararuchi was divinely blessed with a special gift: who could get anything by heart by hearing only once. In course of time Vararuchi became a student of Varsha along with Indradatta and Vyādi. Though Vararuchi was defeated by Pāṇini in a test of scholarship, Vararuchi by hard work excelled Pāṇini in grammar. Later Vararuchi became a minister to King Yogananda of Pāṭaliputra.

Once he went on a visit to the shrine of Durgā. Goddess Durga, being pleased with his austerities, ordered him in a dream to go to the forests of the Vindhya to behold Kāṇābhūti. Proceeding to Vindhya, he saw, surrounded by hundreds of Piśāchas, that Paiśācha Kāṇābhūti, in stature like a śāla tree. When Kāṇābhūti had seen him and respectfully clasped his feet, Kātyāyana sitting down immediately spoke to him thus: "Thou art an observer of the good custom, how hast thou come into this state?" When Kāṇābhūti finished his story, Vararuchi remembered his origin, and exclaimed like one aroused from sleep: "I am that very Pushpadanta, hear that tale from me." and Vararuchi told all his history from his birth at full length.

Vararuchi then went to the tranquil site of the hermitage of Badarî. There he, desirous of putting off his mortal condition, resorted for meditation with intense devotion to that goddess and she, manifesting her real form to him, told him the secret of that meditation which arises from fire, to help him to put off the body. Then Vararuchi, having consumed his body by that form of meditation, reached his own heavenly home.

== Vararuci in Pancatantra ==
The characters in one of the several stories in Pancatantra are King Nanda and Vararuci. This story appear as the fifth story titled A Three in One Story in Strategy Four : Loss of Gains.

Once upon a time, there was a much respected popular king called Nanda. He had a minister called Vararuchi. He was a very learned man well versed in philosophy and statecraft.

Vararuchi's wife was one day annoyed with her husband and kept away from him. Extremely fond of his wife, the minister tried every possible tactics he could think of to please her. Every method failed. Finally he pleaded with her: "Tell me what can I do to make you happy." The wife said sarcastically: "Shave your head cleanly and prostrate before me, then I will be happy." The minister meekly complied with her wish and succeeded in winning back her company and love.

King Nanda's queen also enacted the same drama of shunning his company. Nanda tried every trick he knew of to win her affection. King also failed in his efforts. Then the King fell on her feet and prayed: "My darling, I cannot live without you even for a while. Tell me what should I do to win back your love?" The queen said: "I will be happy if you pretend to be a horse, agree to be bridled and to let me ride you. While racing you must neigh like a horse. Is this acceptable to you?" "Yes," said the king and he did as his wife demanded.

Next day, the king saw Vararuchi with a shaven head and asked him, "Vararuchi, why have you shaved your head all of a sudden?" Vararuchi replied: "O king, is there anything that a woman does not demand and a man does not readily concede? He would do anything, shave his head or neigh like a horse."

Raktamukha, the monkey, then told Karalamukha, the crocodile: "You wicked crocodile, you are a slave of your wife like Nanda and Vararuchi. You tried to kill me but your chatter gave away your plans." That's why the learned have said:

Silence is golden.
Parrots sing and betray
Their presence to the hunter.
The crane eludes the hunter
By keeping his beak tightly shut.

== See also ==
- Chandravakyas
- List of astronomers and mathematicians of the Kerala school
- Vākyakaraṇa
