= Ponmeri Shiva Temple =

Hindu Temple in Vatakara, Kerala

Ponmeri Shiva Temple is a famous Hindu temple dedicated to Lord Shiva in Vatakara, Kozhikode in Kerala, India. The temple is famous due to its unique sub-temple dedicated to Lord Brahma, who is rarely worshipped at temples in South India.

== History and legend ==
In the Eleventh Century AD, the Kadathanad Kings commissioned this Mahadeva Temple constructed by the famed architect Perumthachan. The sanctum-sanctorum of the temple has a grand shivalinga with gold-plated kappu (covering).

Legend has it that due to a quarrel between the Ruler and the architect, the architect left the temple incomplete and hence the temple work shall never be completed. "As incomplete as the work at Ponmeri" goes a proverb in Malayalam. Even today, there are works going on to improve various aspects of the external architecture of the temple. Today, Kshetra Samrakshna Samathi plays a major role in temple renovation and development.

== Deities ==
The peculiarity of the temple is the presence of 'Trimurti': Brahma, Vishnu and Shiva.

In addition to the Shiva, deities Vishnu, Brahma, Ganapati, Shankaranarayana, Adithya (Surya), Boothathevar (God of Spirits), Ayyappa, Murugan and Krishna are also installed in the temple complex.

Ponmeri Siva is fondly called 'Thiyyannur Appan'. There is also a Krishna Temple in nearby Karat.
