= Panniyur Sri Varahamurthy Temple =

Hindu temple in Kerala, India

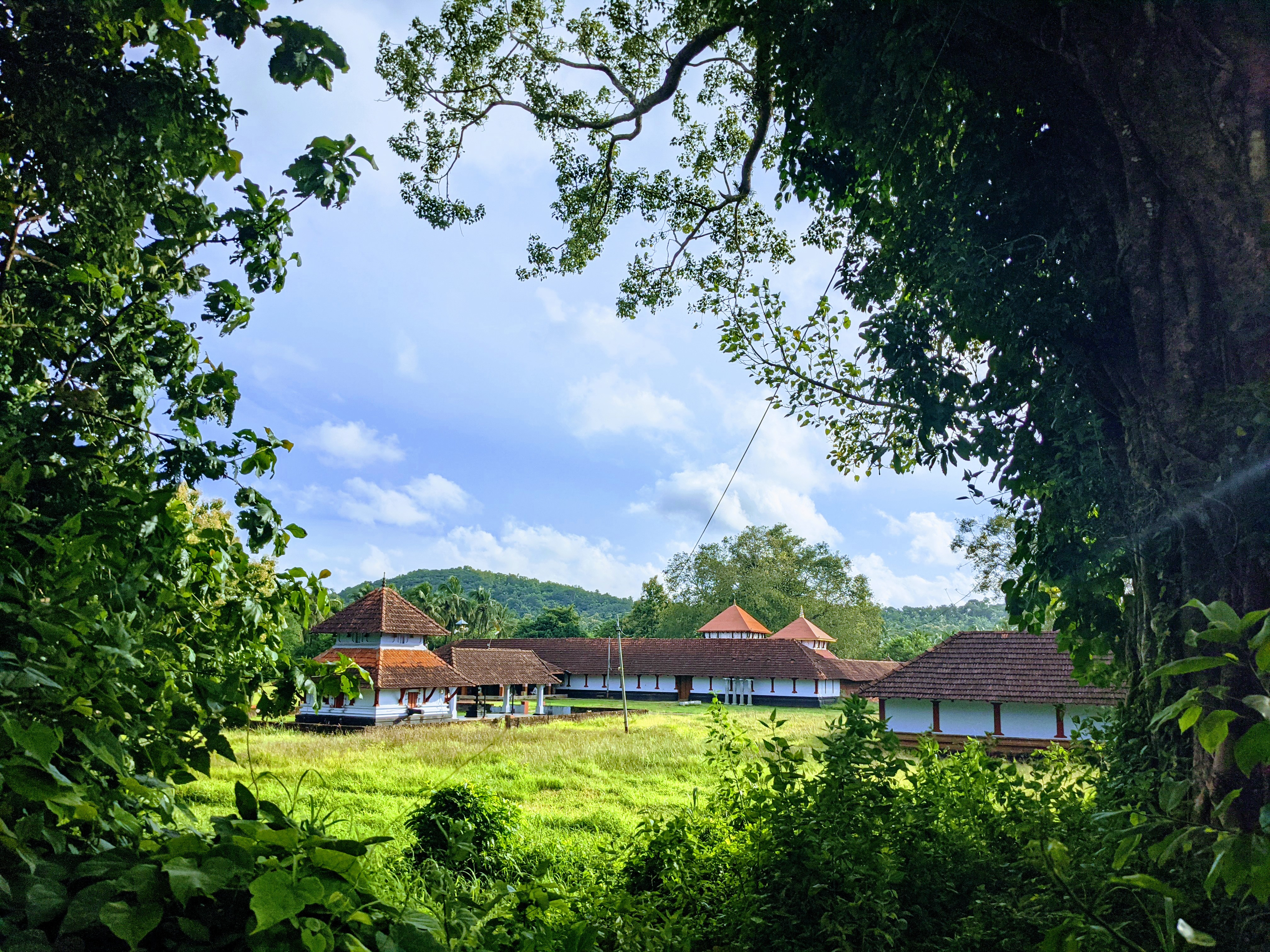

- Location in Kerala

Religion
- Affiliation: Hinduism
- District: Palakkad
- Deity: Varaha
- Festival: Varaha Jayanti
- Governing body: Panniyur Devaswom under Raja Zamorin of Calicut

Location
- Location: Kumbidi, Pattambi
- State: Kerala
- Country: India
- Interactive map of Panniyur Sri Varahamurthy Temple
- Coordinates: 10°49′35″N 76°03′16″E

Architecture
- Type: Traditional Kerala style
- Completed: The Temple's legends and traditions claim that it was the first temple built in Kerala by Parasurama nearly 4000 years ago.

Specifications
- Temple: 12
- Monument: 2
- Elevation: 10 m (33 ft)

Website
- panniyoortemple.org

The Panniyur Sri Varahamurthy Temple is an ancient Hindu temple complex situated at Kumbidi, Pattambi taluk, Palakkad district of Kerala, India. The temple is believed to be the first temple in Kerala consecrated by Parasurama. The temple is dedicated to Varaha, the third avatar of Vishnu, who is positioned with Goddess Bhumi. The temple is included among the 108 Abhimana Kshethrams in Vaishnavate tradition.

== Very Early history ==
Following his victory over the Kshatriyas, Parashuram had donated all that he had won to Kashyap. He had then sought a piece of land to carry out his meditation, and so he had pulled out a small fragment of land from the sea for the purpose. History claims that this small fragment of land form parts of what is now known as Kerala. Eventually Parashuram's piece of land had begun rising and expanding. Disturbed, Parashuram had sought Narada’s help. Narada had advised him to pray to Lord Vishnu. And so Parashuram had begun his meditation in order to propitiate Lord Vishnu. Finally Vishnu had appeared before him and had said, "Once I had assumed the form of Varahamurthy to save the world. Worship that form of mine and this place will have the blessings of ‘Thri Murthy’." The temple of Sri Varaha Murthy was built by Parashurama about 4000 years into the past. For around 3000 years since its inception this temple was considered as one of the prime temples of Kerala.

== Recorded History ==
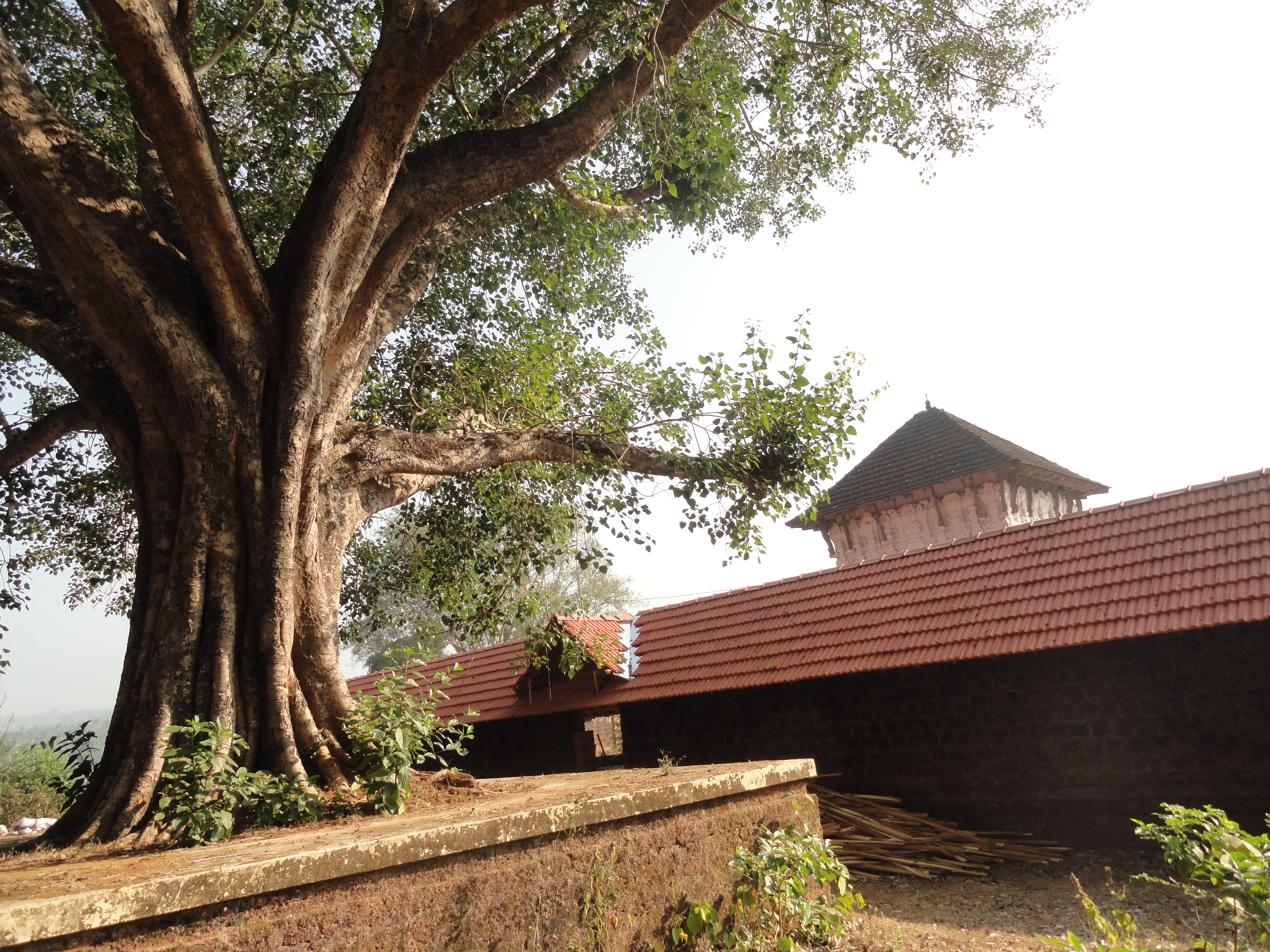
Front Side

It is also said that for an approximate period of 1300 years ranging from 800BC (when the Brahmanas ruled Kerala) to 600 AD (around the end of Perumakkal rule), Sri Varaha Murthy, the reigning God of Kerala's renowned village Panniyur, was worshipped as the supreme god of Kerala. Some recently found stone engravings at Panniyur reveal that 1200 years ago there was an active organisation by the name ‘Panniyuraayiram’, which as its name suggests had 1000 members who were devoted towards carrying out the various cultural and religious activities of the temple. This again stands to emphasise the prominence that this temple enjoyed in those days.

=== Story of Perumthachan ===
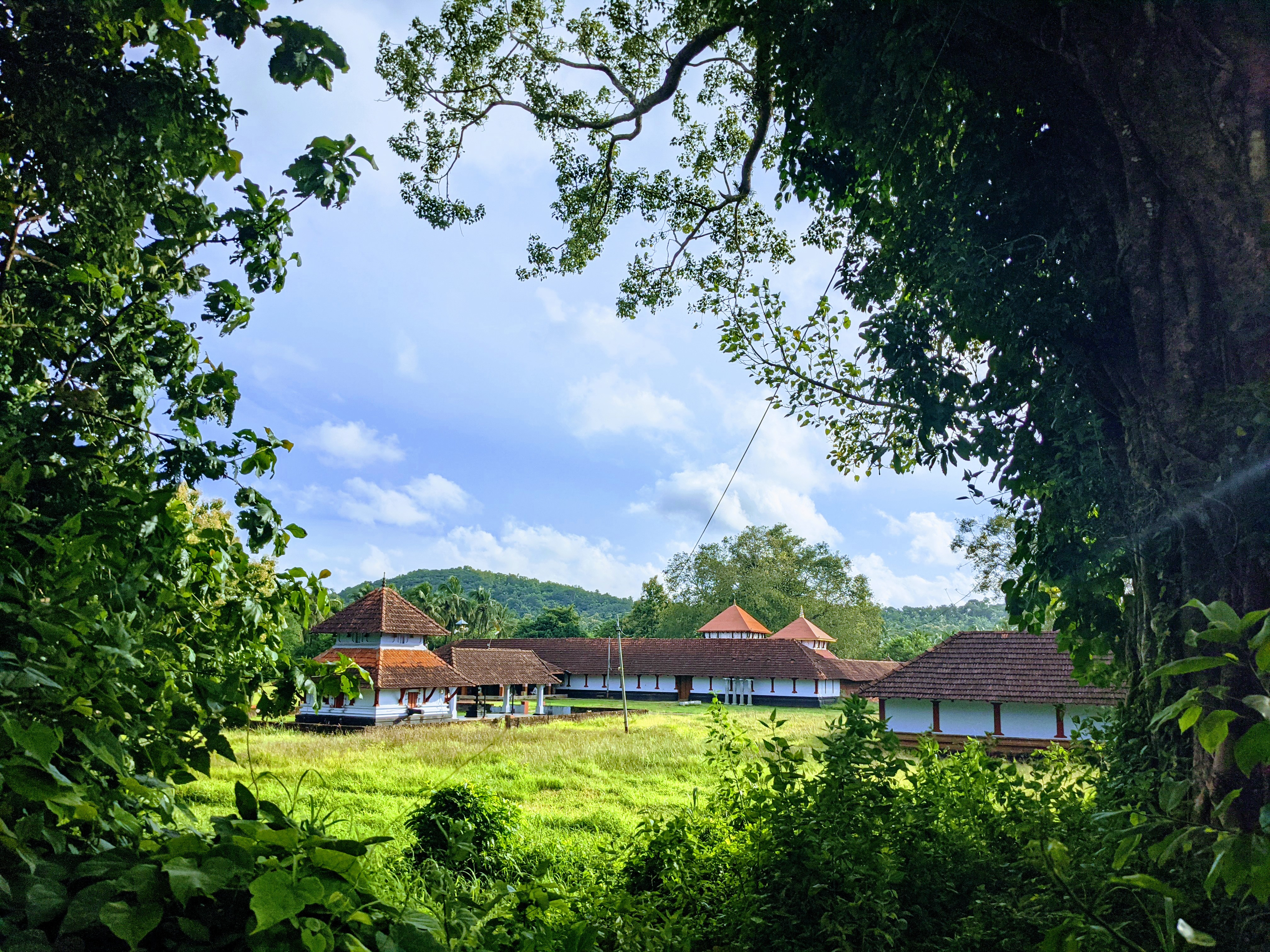
The scenic temple view

Following the demise of his beloved son, for which he held himself responsible, a mentally disturbed Perumthachan, the great carpenter, through the course of his wanderings had reached Panniyur. Weighed down by fatigue, hunger and thirst he had sought relief from the carpenters who had been then carrying out rejuvenation work at the Mahakshetram. Having failed to identify the ‘Master’ of their profession, the workers quite conspicuously neglected him and afterwards broke for lunch without uttering even a single word to him. Quite shocked and angry by such behaviour from their side, the ‘Master’ decided to teach them a lesson. He went inside the sanctum sanctorum where the carpenters had kept blocks of wood ready to be converted into columns. The ‘Master’ made some marks on those wood blocks before resuming his journey. When the workers returned, they quite unwarily sawed along the marks made by the ‘Master’; all the columns just fell short of their appropriate lengths. Their careers and professions at stake, they suddenly realised that the ill-dressed man they had so criminally neglected at lunchtime was the master carpenter Perumthachan himself, and that it was he who caused all this turmoil. Repenting for their behaviour, they decided to seek him the following day and beg for his forgiveness; and so decided they had settled down for the night. They were woken up in the middle of the night by the sound of hammering and chiselling from inside the Sree Kovil. They rushed inside to find that the old man had come back and that he had just finished adding the final touches to their pending work. Amazed and thrilled, they sought his forgiveness. They said, "Oh Master! So many of us have been deriving our livelihoods out of the work we used to do here. Now that you have completed the work we’ll be rendered jobless."

Perumthachan replied, "Do not worry, friends! Panniyur temple will never ever be short of work to offer members of our profession. Anyway I will never touch my chisel and measuring rod ever again."

So saying he had dropped down his chisel and rod, which have been ever carefully preserved by his followers at Panniyur Mahakshetram and are still available for everyone for see.

== Destruction of the idol ==
Of the 32 Gramams of Namboothiris, Panniyur and Sukapuram were the most prominent. Azhvanchery Thamprakkal and Kalpakanchery Thamprakkal were the leaders of Sukapuram and Panniyur respectively. Every Malayali Brahmin owed allegiance either to Sukapuram or to Panniyur. There was unhealthy rivalry between the two Gramams. In order to defeat the scholastically superior Sukapuram, some of the Namboothiris of Panniyur went outside Kerala and brought their Guru to the Land of Varaha. It is also believed that they started worshipping Goddess Varthali and practising some of the secret rites of Tantric Buddhism violating the directions of Lord Varaha. Furthermore, they burned and destroyed the idol of Lord Varaha. So the status of these Namboothiris was lowered by the Zamorin.

Another group of Brahmins, following these events, is believed to have migrated to Keezhmalainadu (present-day Thodupuzha in Idukki district) and sought refuge with the local Maharaja. The ruler granted them land at Pannoor, near Thodupuzha, for their settlement. There, they built a temple and consecrated their family deity, Sree Varaha Moorthy, whom they had previously worshipped at Punnayoor. The consecration was performed in the form of Bala Varaham, a rare type of idol installation even in India. The temple dedicated to Sree Varaha Moorthy still exists at Pannoor and is considered one of the rare temples of its kind in central Kerala.

== Predictions of Adeeri ==
Mahapundit Appath Adeeri had written his autobiography on pieces of copper around 600 years back, in which he has made his predictions for the future. These pieces were found recently and the scriptures have been translated into Malayalam. The Mahapundit had predicted that the Panniyur Mahakshetram would definitely regain its lost glory and fame. The time that he had indicated in his writings is ripe now. He had foretold that when this blessed day arrives, everyone who believes in Shri Varahamurthy would be blessed with ‘Abhishta Karya Sidhdhi’ (i.e. the realisation of everything that one had prayed for). Devotees believe that when in peril, if one utters the words ‘Varahamurthy Rakshikane’ (save me, Varahamurthy) thrice, Shri Varahamurthy would rescue one from all impending perils and dangers.

== The Devaprashnangal ==
The ‘Devaprashnangal’ held here since 1983 indicate that within the next two revolutionary periods of the Saturn, this temple shall enhance in prestige and prominence to be at par with great temples like Guruvayur and Shabarimala. It is clear that Shri Varahamurthy has reincarnated himself at this temple to bless one and everyone. Many a devotee has claimed that he/she has already felt the blessing and glorious presence of Shri Varahmurthy. It is said that all devotees of Shri Varahamurthy shall be blessed with ‘Abhishta Karya Sidhdhi’. And hence the number of devotees of Shri Varahamurthy is increasing day by day.

== Today ==
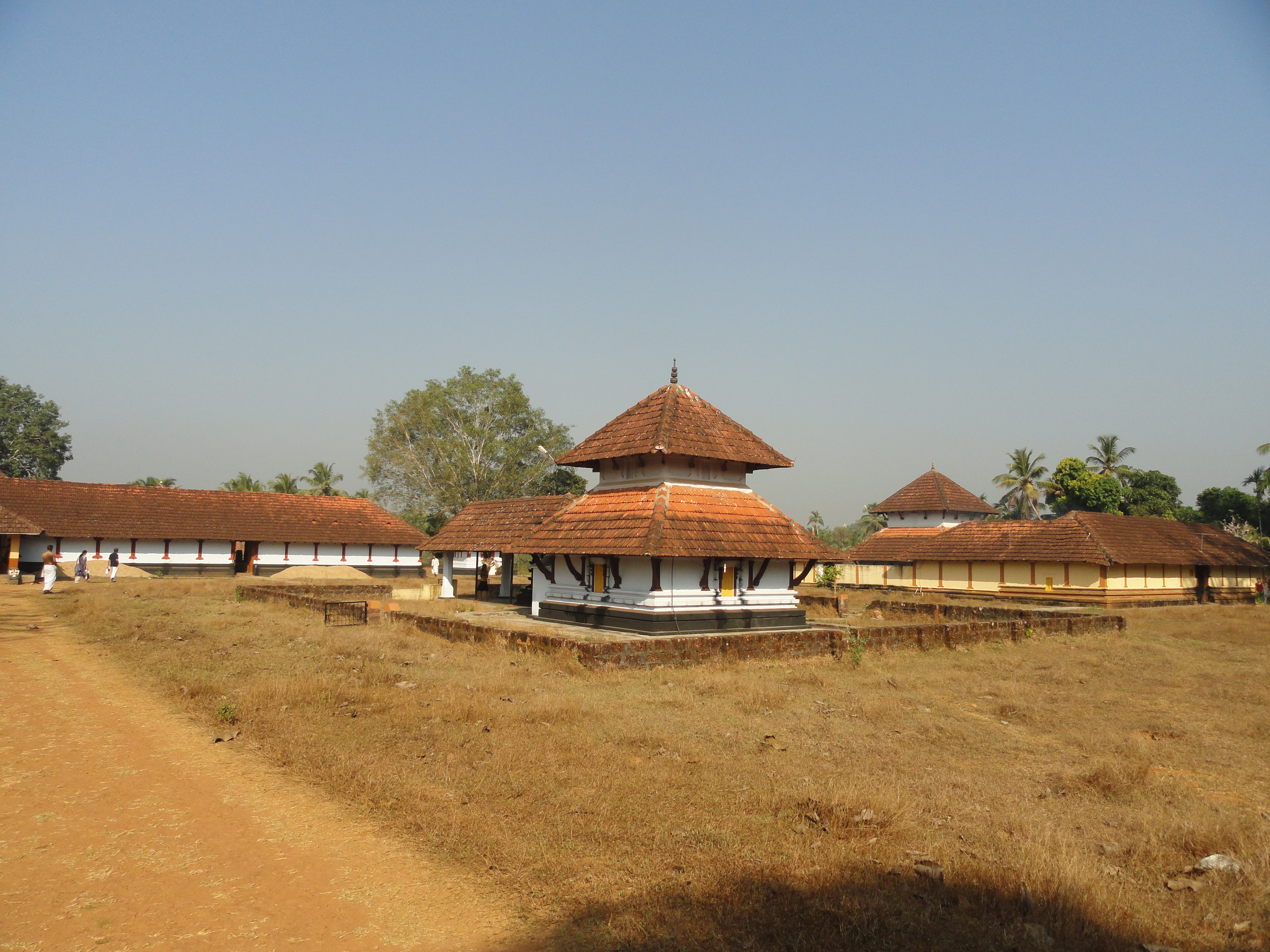
Varaha

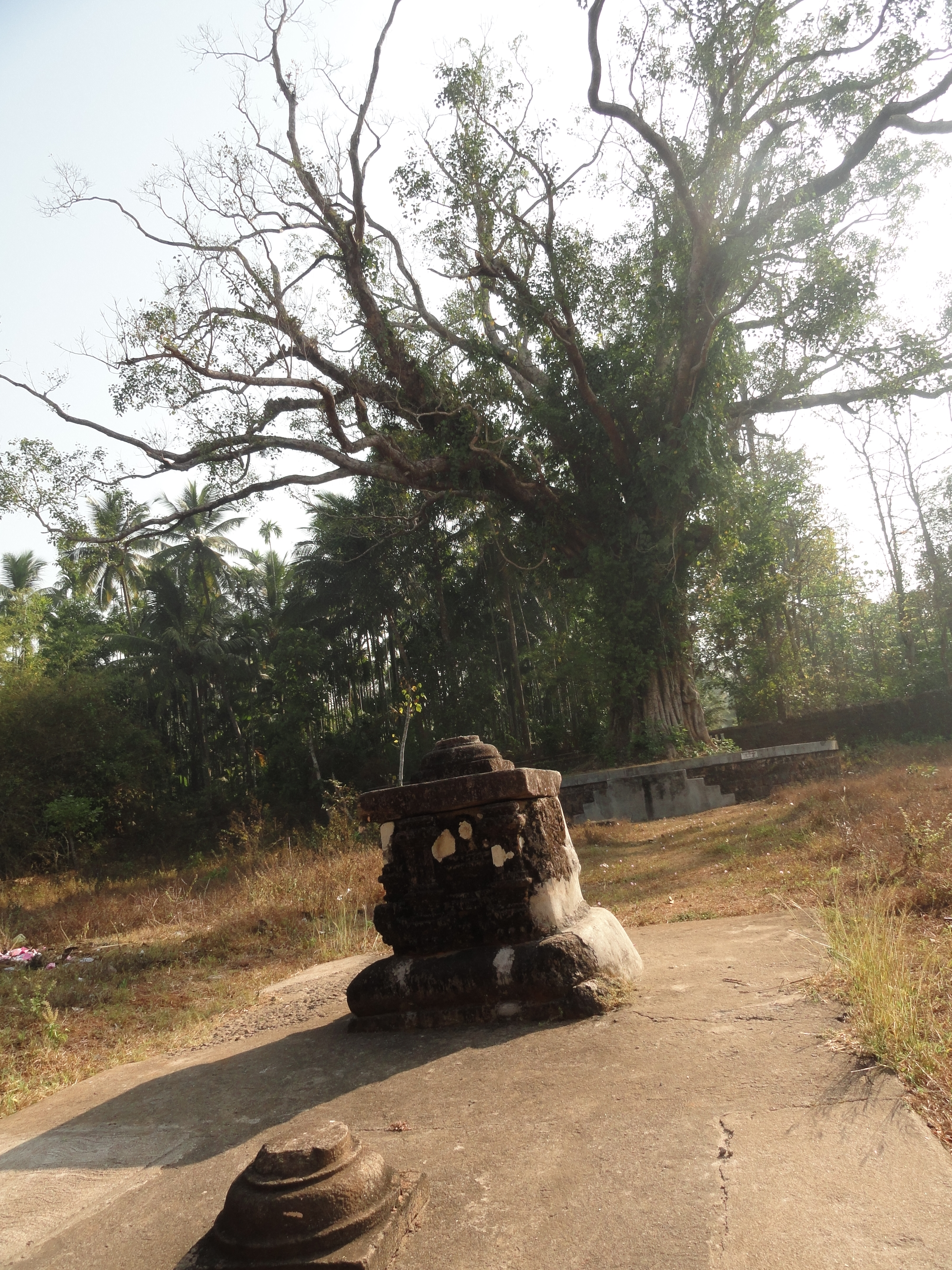
Banyan Tree

There are only very few temples in Kerala that worship the ‘Varaha’ avatar of Shri Vishnu. This temple also houses and worships Updevtas like Sri Shiva (‘Vadakovil’), Sri Ayyappa, Sri Durgabhagavathy, Sri Ganapathy, Sri Subramanya and Sri Lakshmi Narayan. This temple is also said to have the blessings of Chitragupta and Yakshi. This temple also has a stage and a huge ground to accommodate spectators. The legendary ‘Panniyur thura’ is located just to the north of the Mahakshetra. It is believed that the fishpond constructed by Parashuram used to be located just a little south of the temple.

Among the different pujas conducted here the most important one happens to be the ‘Abhishta Sidhdhi Puja’. This puja is believed to pave the way for ‘Abhishta Karya Sidhdhi’.

‘SANDHYA DEEPARADHANA’ is considered as the most auspicious time to seek the blessings of Sri Varahamurthy. Covered in sandalwood paste and adorned in scintillating jewellery, the divine form of Sri Varahamurthy is for every mind to embrace and seek solace with.

== Location ==
The Temple is situated in Kumbidi, a village in Palakkad district on the border of Malappuram district is just 4 km from the Keltron Junction, in between Kuttippuram and Edappal on SH-69 ( Kuttippuram - Thrissur Highway ). The famous Guruvayur temple is only 33 km away. By road, there are KSRTC and private buses available to Kumbidi from nearby towns. The nearest railway station is at Kuttippuram is only 7 km away. The nearest airport is Calicut International Airport (distance 70 km) and the Cochin International/Nedumbassery Airport (distance 100 km) away. All major International flight services are operated from these airports.
