= Chandravakyas =

Moon's motions in Indian astronomy

Chandravākyas (IAST: Candravākyas) are a collection of numbers, arranged in the form of a list, related to the motion of the Moon in its orbit around the Earth. These numbers are couched in the katapayadi system of representation of numbers and so apparently appear like a list of words, or phrases or short sentences written in Sanskrit and hence the terminology Chandravākyas. In Sanskrit, Chandra is the Moon and vākya means a sentence. The term Chandravākyas could thus be translated as Moon-sentences.

Vararuchi (c. 4th century CE), a legendary figure in the astronomical traditions of Kerala, is credited with the authorship of the collection of Chandravākyas. These were routinely made use of for computations of native almanacs and for predicting the position of the Moon. The work ascribed to Vararuchi is also known as Chandravākyāni, or Vararucivākyāni, or Pañcāṅgavākyāni.

Madhava of Sangamagrama (c. 1350 – c. 1425), the founder of the Kerala school of astronomy and mathematics, had set forth a revised set of Chandravākyās, together with a method for computing them, in his work titled Venvaroha.

Chandravākyas were also popular in Tamil Nadu region of South India. There, the astrologers and astronomers used these vākyās to construct almanacs. These almanacs were popularly referred to as the Vākya-pañcāṅgas. This is used in contrast to the modern mode computation of almanacs based on parameters derived from astronomical observations that are known as Dṛk Pañcāṅgas ( or Thirukanitha Pañcāṅgas).

== Vākya tradition ==
The Parahita system of astronomical computations introduced by Haridatta (ca. 683 CE), though simplified the computational processes, required long tables of numbers for its effective implementation. For timely use of these numbers they had to be memorised in toto and probably the system of constructing astronomical Vākyas arose as an answer to this problem. The katapayadi system provided the most convenient medium for constructing easily memorable mnemonics for the numbers in these tables. Chandravākyās ascribed to Vararuci are the earliest example of such a set of mnemonics. The period of Vararuci of Kerala tradition has been determined as around fourth century CE and the year of the promulgation of the Parahita system is known to be 683 CE, Vararuci's Chandravākyās should have been around at the time of the institution of the Parahita system.

Besides Vararuci's Vākyas, several other sets of Vākyas had been composed by astronomers and mathematicians of the Kerala school. While Vararuci's Vākyas contain a list of 248 numbers, another set of Vākyas relating to Moon's motion contains 3031 numbers. There is a set of 2075 Vākyas called Samudra-vākyas or Maṇḍala-vākyas or Kujādi-pañcagraha-mahāvākyas relating to the motion of the five planets Kuja (Mars), Budha (Mercury), Guru (Jupiter), Bhrigu (Venus) and Sani (Saturn). There are also lists of Vākyas encoding other mathematical tables like Madhava's sine table.

== Vākya-pañcāṅga ==
The first known text to use these Chandravākyass is Haridatta's manual on his Parahita system, known as Graha-cāra-nibandhana. The next major work that makes use of the mnemonic system of the Vākyas which has come down to us is Vākya-karaṇa (karaṇa, or computations, utilising Vākyas). The authorship of this work is uncertain, but, is apocryphally assigned to Vararuci. The work is known to have been composed around 1300 CE. It has been extensively commented upon by Sundararaja (c.1500 CE) of Trichinopopy of Tamil Nadu. The almanac makers of Tamil Nadu fully make use of this Vākya-karaṇa for computing the almanacs. These almanacs are known as Vākya-pañcāṅgas.

== Numbers encoded in Chandravākyās ==
The Moon's orbit approximates an ellipse rather than a circle. The orientation and the shape of this orbit is not fixed. In particular, the positions of the extreme points, the point of closest approach (perigee) and the point of farthest excursion (apogee), make a full circle in about nine years. It takes the Moon longer to return to the same position, perigee or apogee, because it moved ahead during one revolution. This longer period is called the anomalistic month, and has an average length of 27.554551 days (27 d 13 h 18 min 33.2 s). The apparent diameter of the Moon varies with this period. 9 anomalistic months constitute a period of approximately 248 days. The differences in the longitudes of the Moon on the successive days of a 248-day cycle constitute the Chandravākyas. Each set of Chandravākyas contains a list of 248 Vākyās or sentences.

== See also ==
- Indian astronomy
- Indian mathematics
- Vākyakaraṇa
- Vākyapañcāṅga
- Vararuchi
