= Vasoorimala =

Hindu goddess

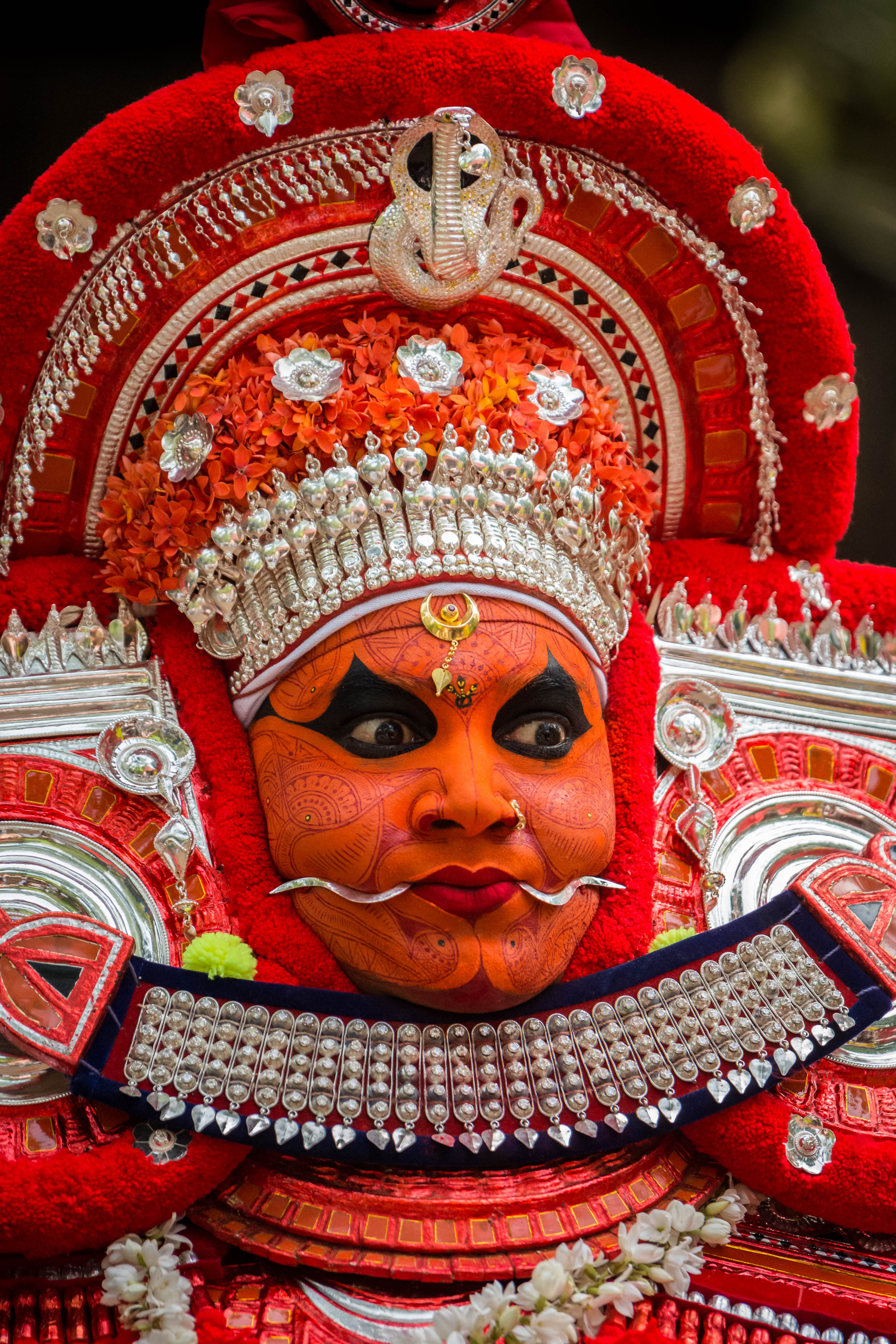
- A depiction of Vasoorimala in Theyyam
- Affiliation: Hinduism
- Region: Kerala, India

Genealogy
- Spouse: Darikan (Asura)

Vasoorimala is a female deity worshiped in many parts of Kerala and Kodagu region of Karnataka. She is worshipped as an Upa Devata (sub-deity) in Bhadrakali or Shiva temples. Vasoorimala is believed to be a deity that prevents contagious diseases like smallpox, chickenpox, and measles. In North Kerala, Vasoorimala is worshipped and performed as Vasoorimala Theyyam. According to myths, Manodari, wife of Asura named Darikan was later named as Vasoorimala.

== Etymology ==
Vasoori is the Malayalam word for the disease smallpox. Vasoorimala literally means a chain of pox pustules.

== Background ==
In ancient times it was believed that diseases were caused by the wrath of God. Therefore, they worshiped gods who sowed diseases and gods who healed. Vasoorimala is believed to be the deity of communicable diseases like smallpox, chickenpox, measles etc. Vasoorimala is worshipped as a sub deity in temples in Kerala including Kodungallur Bhagavathy Temple, Valiyakulangara Devi Temple, Mahadevikad, Sri Porkili Kavu, and Vasoorimala Devi Temple, Mavelikara.

== Myth ==
=== Wife of Darikan ===
The story of Bhadrakali is very prominent in Indian mythology, and goddess Bhadrakali is worshipped all over India. According to the Markandeya Purana, there was an Asura named Darikan (also spelled as Darukan) and goddess Bhadrakali appeared from the third eye of Lord Shiva killed him in a battle.

The story of Vasoorimala from Kerala folklore is mentioned in Aithihyamala written by Kottarathil Sankunni. During the war between Bhadrakali and Darikan, when it was almost certain that Darikan would die in battle with Bhadrakali, Manodari, wife of Darikan approached Kailasa and began intense penance to please Lord Shiva. Satisfied with her adoration, Shiva wiped the sweat from his body and gave it to her and blessed her and said that if she spray it on the bodies of the people, they would give her everything she needed. Manodari saw Bhadrakali, who won the battle, coming with her husband's head. On anger she sprayed that sweaty water on Bhadrakali's body, and as a result smallpox appeared on Bhadrakali's body. Bhadrakali pierced Manodari's eyes, named her Vasoorimala and made her a companion of herself.

=== Others ===
Another myth says that Vasoorimala arose from the Shiva consciousness when Lord Shiva contracted smallpox. Vasoorimala can also be seen as a follower of Kurumba (Bhadrakali) in killing Darika.

== Vasoorimala Theyyam ==
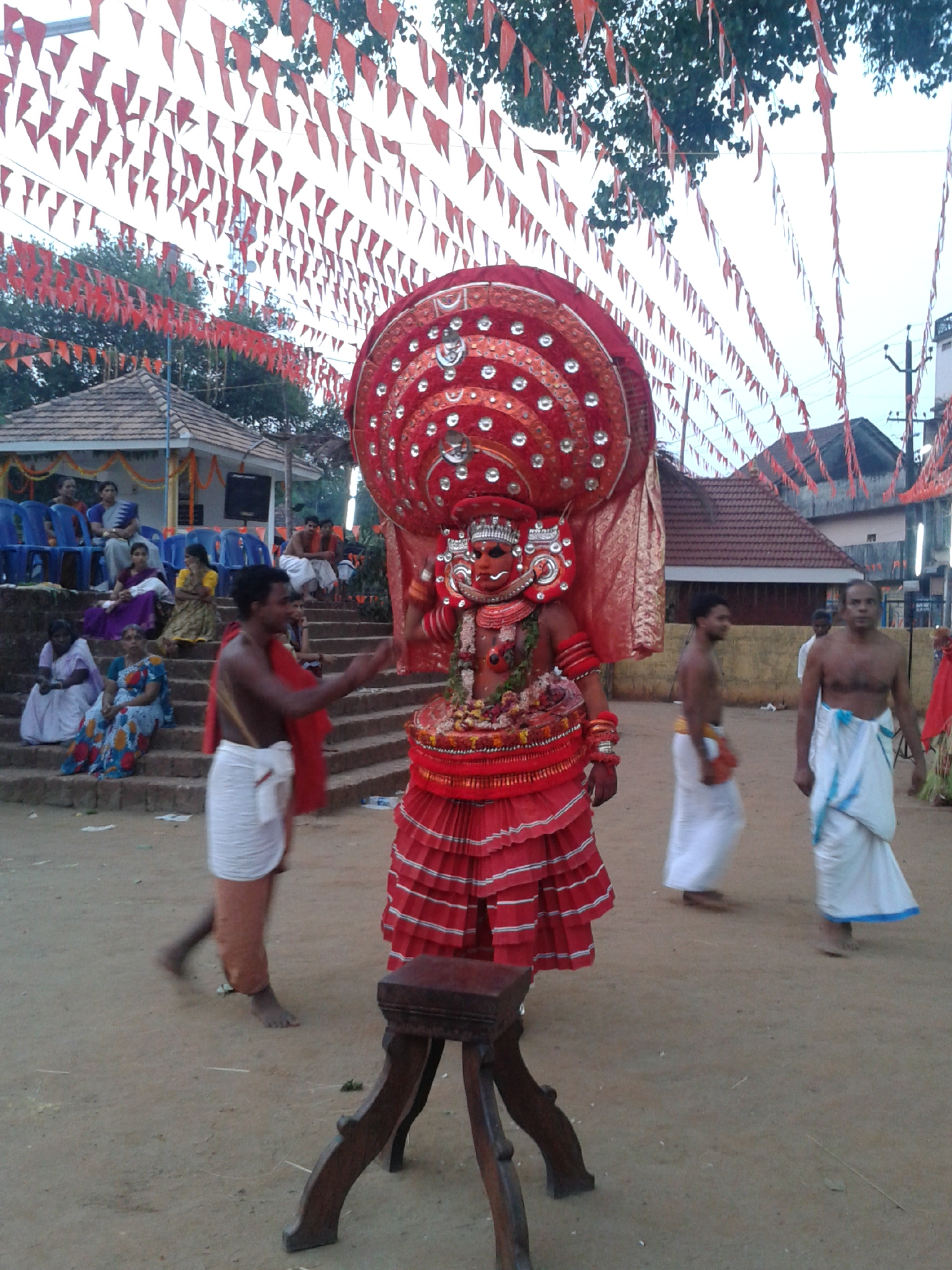
Vasoorimala theyyam

Vasoorimala Theyyam is a theyyam performed in temples in North Kerala. When the smallpox epidemic broke out, it is believed that people started worshiping smallpox in the form of theyyam to get rid of the disease. Now this theyyam is being performed for the cure of diseases.
