= Tirugaṇita-pañcāṅgam =

Almanac popular among Tamil speaking people

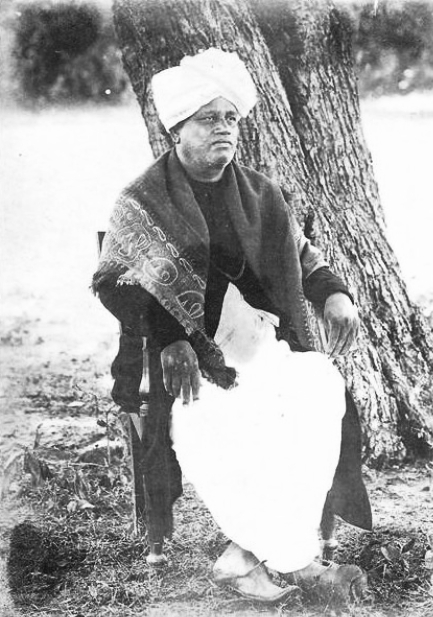
Chintamani Ragoonathachari (1822 – 5 February 1880)

Tirugaṇita-pañcāṅgam, also known as Dṛggaṇita pañcāṅgam, is an almanac popular among Tamil speaking people in India and the world over. It is based on the modern values of the various astronomical parameters and it incorporates modern formulas and computational schemes. It was introduced by Chinthamani Ragoonatha Chary (1822 – 5 February 1880) an Indian astronomer attached to the then Madras Observatory. There is another almanac known as Vākyapañcāṅgam, also popular among Tamil speaking people which is based on the astronomical data and computational methods propounded in the various Siddhānta texts like the Sūrya-Siddhānta and which uses the text Vākyakaraṇa of anonymous authorship as the basic source book.

The Dṛggaṇita pañcāṅgam popular among Tamil speaking people is not to be confused with the Dṛggaṇita pañcāṅgam popular among Malayalam speaking people. The latter is the nearly unanimous choice of almanac of people in Kerala and it was established by Vatasseri Parameshvaran Nambudiri (c. 1380–1460) who was a major Indian mathematician and astronomer of the Kerala school of astronomy and mathematics founded by Madhava of Sangamagrama. Since this has become the standard pañcāṅgam among people of Kerala, the adjective Dṛggaṇita is no longer applied to the Malayalam pañcāṅgam.

== Introduction of Tirugaṇita-pañcāṅgam ==
Chinthamani Ragoonatha Chary was a member of a family of almanac makers and as such he was completely familiar with the traditional computational techniques employed by native astronomers. He joined the Madras Observatory as a menial laborer and rose to occupy the high position of first assistant in the Madras Observatory. He was assistant to Norman Pogson, the British Government Astronomer and head of the Madras Observatory during 1861 - 1891. Ragoonatha Chary was a keen observer and an ardent learner. He acquired on his own efforts enough expertise in mathematics to devise novel methods of astronomical computations.

During his association with the Observatory, he became aware of the acute inaccuracies in the almanacs that were being used by the native people of southern India. Incorporating modern western knowledge with Siddhāntic concepts and techniques he developed his own Pañcāṅga and referred to it as Dṛggaṇita Pañcāṅgam, the adjective Dṛggaṇita was to emphasize the fact that the new almanac was in consonance with observations. The epithet Dṛig derived from ' Dṛṣṭi literally means ‘observation’. Ragoonatha Chary started publishing his new Dṛggaṇita Pañcāṅgam from 1869 onward. It was printed in both Tamil and Telugu scripts. There were two versions of the Pañcāṅgam, one of which was a short version called Śiriya Pañcāṅgam and the other a longer one called Periya Pañcāṅgam.

Ragoonatha Chary gave several lectures to popularize the new almanac. His new Pañcāṅgam was severely criticized by the traditionalists on the ground that it was against the wisdom and teachings of ancient sages and seers. However, after several debates Ragoonatha Chary was able to win over the trust of the Chief of the Sriperumpudur Ahobilam Matt. Later Ragoonatha Chary and his friends succeeded in organizing a meeting at Sankara Mutt at Kumbakonam (now at Kanchipuram). The meeting was attended by eminent astronomical and astrological scholars, and great public personalities like Diwan Bahadur R V Srinivasa Iyer, Inspector General of Registration Rao Bahadur Appa Sastrigal and Appa Dikshitar. The meeting arrived at the conclusion that the Drig system needs to be followed and a new almanac need to be prepared on those lines. From then on a Drig almanac began to be published under the auspices of Kanchi Sankaracharya Matt in the name of "Sri Kanchi Math almanac".

== See also ==
- Vākyapañcāṅgam
- Drigganita
