= Kumbidi =

- village
- Location in Kerala, India
- Coordinates: 10°49′51″N 76°03′03″E
- Country: India
- State: Kerala
- District: Palakkad

Area
  - Total: 20.95 km^{2} (8.09 sq mi)
- Elevation: 11 m (36 ft)

Population (2001)
  - Total: 22,601
  - Density: 1,079/km^{2} (2,794/sq mi)

Languages
  - Official: Malayalam, English
- Time zone: UTC+5:30 (IST)
- Postal code: 679 553
- Vehicle registration: KL-52

Kumbidi is a village in Pattambi taluk of Palakkad district in the Indian state of Kerala. It is the administrative headquarters and main commercial centre of Anakkara Panchayath. It is situated opposite to Kuttippuram town and adjacent to Thavanur and Tirunavaya towns. Kumbidi town area extends from town centre to the surrounding areas such as Ummathur, Thottazhiyam, Perumbalam, Panniyur, Puramathilssery, Maniyam Perumbalam and Melazhiyam. It is located on the southern bank of Bharathappuzha river (Nila, Ponnani River, or Kuttippuram River). Kumbidi is located about 5 km south of Kuttippuram town. It was a part of Ponnani taluk until 16 June 1969.

Kumbidi is the site for the proposed Kalagramam by The Kerala Lalithakala Akademi, a village for artists and sculptures. It will come up in 5 acres of land on the banks of River Nila, is aimed at accommodating artists and sculptures along with their families and provide them facilities to pursue their creative work. Major offices like Panchayat Office, PHC, Krishi Bhavan, Village Office, SBT, CO-operative Bank etc. are situated at Kumbidi Town. There is one River Gauge Station running under The Central Water Commission(CWC;Govt. Of India) in Kumbidi to examining the quantity and quality of water in the Bharathapuzha River.

== Anakkara Vadakkath Family ==
Vadakkath Tharavadu at Anakkara, a nalukkettu of architectural beauty, is only 3 km from Kumbidi Town. It gave birth to some of the great personalities of the nation like A.V. Kuttymalu Amma, a freedom fighter and Congress leader. She and her late husband K. Madhava Menon were among the pioneers of the freedom movement under the leadership of the Congress party.

Freedom fighter and member of the Constituent Assembly of India late Ammu Swaminathan (1874–1978) is also a member of this family. Lakshmi Sehgal or Captain Laxmi, an ex-officer of the Indian National Army, is another illustrious member of the Anakkara Vadakkath family. All India Democratic Women's Association president Subhashini Ali is the daughter of Captain Laxmi.

Yet another famous member of the family is Mrinalini Sarabhai, renowned classical dancer, choreographer and instructor. Ms. Sarabhai is the widow of Vikram Sarabhai, father of the Indian Space Programme. Her daughter Mallika Sarabhai is an activist and Indian classical dancer.

It was constructed by P. Govinda Menon and his brother P. Theyunni Menon in 1896, ‘Vadakkath’ mansion is a typical existing example of traditional Kerala style house. G. Susheela, herself a freedom fighter, is the lone member living in this illustrious Tharavad now.

== Archeology ==
The hills of Anakkara and Kumbidi is becoming a site of great archeological importance because of many recent findings. The archeological excavation gives the evidences of first excavated Iron-Age habitation-cum-burial site in Kerala. Archaeologists have discovered a pre-historic necropolis (cemetery) with megalithic cairn circles dating back 2,500 years, many post holes that probably point to the ancient practice of excarnation, a 'wood-henge'-like ritual monument and a site of primitive astronomical intelligence.

The excavation of the cairn circle and archaeological experimentation with postholes are attracting scholars from the neighbouring States. K. Rajan (Head, Department of Archaeology, Pondicherry University), P. Rajendran (Vice Chancellor of Tamil University, Thanjavur), Athiyaman and Selvakumar (Archaeology Department, Tamil University), P.J. Cherian (Director, KCHR), Hemendran (Director, State Department of Archaeology) are among those who have already visited the site.

== Educational institutions ==
- G.T.J.B School, Kumbidi
- A.J.B School, Ummathur
- Crescent Public School, Kumbidi
- G.H.S.S., Anakkara
- AWH College of Science & Technology, Anakkara
- DIET, Anakkara
- Swaminatha Vidyalayam, Anakkara
- Modern Higher Secondary School pottur

== Religious centres ==
- Panniyur Sri Varahamurthy Temple, Panniyur
- Mandakathil Bhagavathy Temple, Thottazhiyam
- Kodalil Vamanamurthy Temple, Perumbalam
- Vadakke Mulayamparabath Bhagavathy Temple, Perumbalam
- Ayyappankavu Vishnu Temple, Puramathilssery
- Pottammal Bhagavathy Temple, Panniyur
- Poozhikunnath Bhagavathi Sthanam, Ummathur
- Siva Temple, Ummathur
- Juma Masjid, Kumbidi
- Town Juma masjid Kumbidi
- Issathul Islam Madrassa kumbidi
- Juma Masjid, Pallipadi
- Juma Masjid, Ummathur
- Juma Masjid, Manniyam Perumbalam

== Transportation ==
- Road: Kumbidi is well connected to other parts of the state by road. The town lies on Kuttippuram-Pattambi Road and only 4 km from Thrissur-Kuttippuram State Highway and 5 km from NH 66 (Old NH-17).
- Railway Station: Nearest Railway Station is at Kuttippuram is 7 km away, one of the major railway stations in the Malabar Region.
- Nearest Airport: Calicut International Airport is approximately 57 kilometers and Cochin International Airport is 98 km away.

== Sports clubs ==
- CITIZENS KUMBIDI
- The Real CITIZENS
- Team of Thampuran's
- Sportigo FC Kumbidi
- New Citizens Kumbidi
- Nila Ummathur
- Friends Ummathur
- MFA Manniyam Perumbalam
- SEVANA KALA KAYIKA SAMSKARIKA SAMITHI PERUMBALAM PALLIPADI
- Bharath Arts & Sports Club Melazhiyam
