= Naranath Bhranthan =

Character in Malayalam folklore

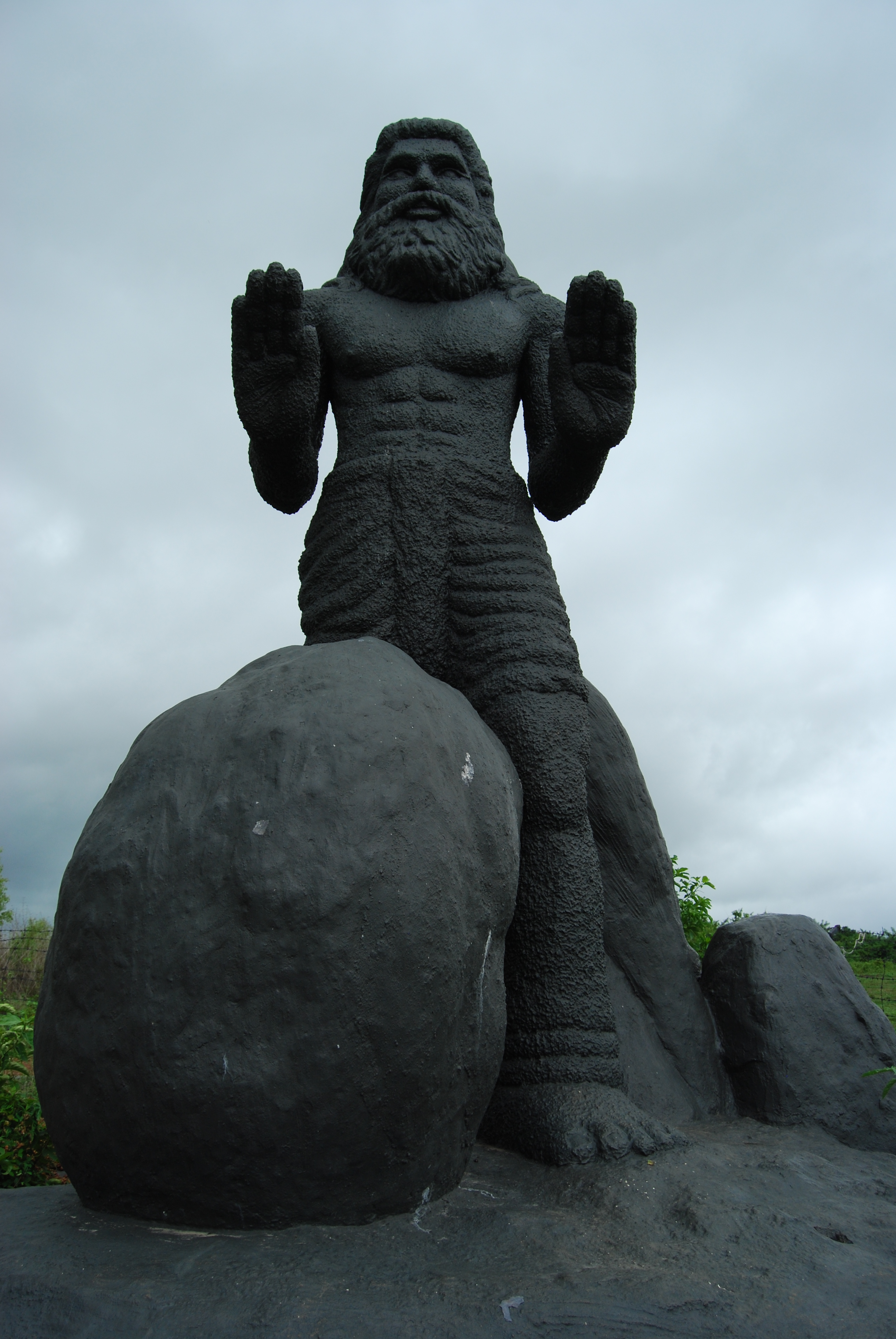
Statue of Naranath Branthan near Sree Rayiranellur Malayil Bhagavathy Temple in Naduvattom, Palakkad.

Naranath Bhranthan (also spelled Naranathu Bhranthan; Malayalam: നാറാണത്ത് ഭ്രാന്തൻ; meaning "the madman of Naranam") is a figure in Kerala folklore associated with the legend of Parayi Petta Panthirukulam. Stories about him are included in Kottarathil Sankunni’s Aithihyamala. He is best known for a tale in which he repeatedly rolls a boulder up a hill and watches it roll back down.

== Folklore ==
Naranath Bhranthan features prominently in the legends of Parayi Petta Panthirukulam. According to this legend Naranath Bhranthan was one of the twelve children of Vararuchi and Parayi (a woman from Paraiya caste; also known as Panchami). He was abandoned at birth and later adopted by a Namboothiri household at Narayanamangalath Mana. In one well-known tale, he repeatedly rolls a large boulder up a hill and, when it reaches the top, allows it to roll back down, laughing at the sight.

Another episode recounts an encounter with the goddess Bhadrakali at a cremation ground. One evening, Naranath Bhranthan arrived at a cremation ground to cook his meal. When Bhadrakali and her attendants appeared, he showed no fear despite their terrifying display. Realizing he was no ordinary man, Bhadrakali asked permission to leave, explaining she had come to dance but could not do so with humans present. Naranath Bhranthan refused to leave. Unable to frighten or convince him, Bhadrakali decided to bless him instead. When asked what boon he desired, he first requested an additional day of life, then asked to die a day earlier than destined, and finally asked her to move the swelling from his left leg to his right leg—a request she granted before departing.

Retellings of these stories vary in their details across different versions of the legend.

== Contemporary literature ==
Naranath Branthan is the protagonist of an acclaimed eponymous poem by V. Madhusoodhanan Nair.

== See also ==
- Sisyphus – a similar character
