= Pambu Panchangam =

Tamil calendar

Pambu Panchangam (Tamil: பாம்பு பஞ்சாங்கம், Pāmpu Pañcāṅkam, IPA: [ˈpaːmbɨ ˌpɐn̻ʲt͡ʃaŋɡɐm]) is the name of a Tamil calendar published by Manonmani Vilasam Press in Chennai since 1883. The publisher's title for the almanac for the Tamil year 2012–2013 is Asal No. 28, Nandana Varsha Suddha Vakya Panchangam (அசல் 28—நெ. நந்தன வருஷ சுத்த வாக்கிய பஞ்சாங்கம்). The almanac is popularly referred to as the Pambu Panchangam because the cover page of the almanac carries a prominent image of a snake (Tamil: பாம்பு, pāmpu). The snake referred to here is the Moon in the Panchangam. The image of the snake contains 27 small circles embedded with it. These circles represent the 27 days the Moon takes to complete one full cycle. The reason Moon is represented as a snake is that, due to the pull and push of various planets, its path is like the path left by a snake on sand.

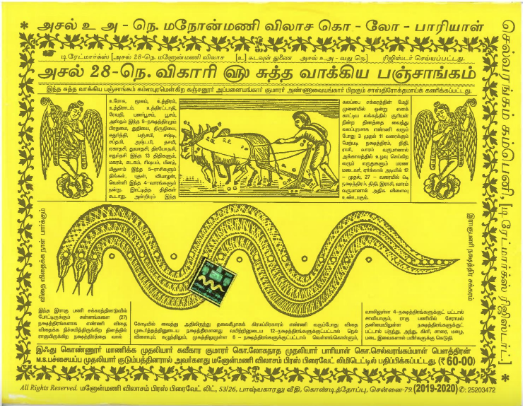
பாம்பு பஞ்சாங்கத்தின் அட்டைப் படம்

Pambu Panchangam is the most popular Tamil almanac among Tamil speaking people worldwide.

== Publishing history ==
The publication of the yearly Pambu Panchangam was started by Konnur Manicka Mudhaliar in 1883 and during the initial years it was printed in a press, known by the name Manonmani Vilasam Press, established exclusively for printing the Panchangam. Initially the press was at Seven Wells Road. Currently it is functioning in Kondithope. The Press now only formulates and distributes the Panchangam, the actual printing being done by other printers on contract basis. About three hundred thousand copies are printed and distributed every year.

== See also ==
- Vākyapañcāṅga
