= Erkkara Raman Nambudiri =

Hindu priest and scholar

Erkkara Raman Nambudiri (1898–1983) was a Śrauta High Priest and scholar who helped to revive the ancient Vedam-Yajnam traditions in Kerala, India, that had begun to decline due to the onslaught of Western culture and influence after Indian Independence.

== Early life ==
Erkkara Raman Nambudiri was born on Mithunam 2, 1073 (ME) (June 1898) on Karthika star to Erkkara Vasudevan Somayaajipad and Perindeeri Chennaath "Mahal" Sreedevi Pathinaadi in Kerala, India. After his Upanayanam and basic education under Muriyath Achyutha Varier, he received training under his father in the Rigvedam (the entire text). At the age of 12, the Samavartana ceremony was performed (ritual for completion of Vedic education).

Erkkara continued his studies in Sanskrit, kavyas, Thaithireeyam Bhaasha (on rituals of Yaagam), Brahmanas, Upanishads, Aranyakams, etc., and spent around two years studying shastras (texts) under Neelakandhan Namboodiri in Pakaraavoor Gurukulam. Starting from age 13 and during the rest of his life, he participated in most of the Yaagams performed in Kerala - as Parikarmi, "Rithwik", and in many lead roles.

== Vedic wisdom ==
At the age of 14, Erkkara performed "Aarthwijyam" as "Aagneedhran" (a Rithwik) in a Yaagam in the Thottam Mana of Paanjaal. Next year at the age of 15, his exemplary and confident performance in the difficult Aarthwijyam of "Aadhwaram" got praise from the greats of the time. Then, when he was 24, he earned accolades in a difficult and mentally and physically tiring Aadhwaram role in a Saagnikamathiraathram in Kavapra Maarath Mana. This was followed by his role as "Sadasyan" - an expert observer/adviser - in the Pakaraavoor and Neddham Yaagams. At the young age of 27 he performed "Pryshaarttham Parayuka", which is reserved for the great Vedic scholars in another Yaagam in Paanjaal Thottam Mana.

Apart from matters relating to yajna, Erkkara successfully participated in the Vedam test - Anyonyam at Kadavalloor. Erkkara participated in the 1942 - 43 (1118 ME) "Murahomam" at Guruvayur. His knowledge of Sanskrit and Saasthrams was enriched considerably as a result of his close association with the great scholars such as Vidwaan Maanthitta, and Pareekshith Thampuraan.

Erkkara was renowned for his sharp intellect and deep knowledge of the scriptures. Once he recited from memory the entire "Kausheethaka Braahmanam" (a scripture known to some and memorised by few) to Dr E R Sreekrishna Sharma who was in search of its original text. These, as well as his close relations with foreign scholars like Frits Staal and Parpola, elevated him to national and international levels.

Being a renowned scholar, his word was the last on matters relating to Śrauta and Vedic rituals.

== Works ==
After 1970, Erkkara wrote several articles relating to Vedam which got published. He was the founding editor of "Anaadi" monthly which was started in 1973.

Erkkara’s first book "Aamnaaya Mathhanam" got him the Sahitya Akademi Award. His later books "Ekaahaaheena Sathrangal" and "Srouthakarma Vivekam" were well received by scholars.

== Personal life ==
Erkkara was not only a bright scholar and orthodox ritualist, but he managed to look after his family property and family temple in place of his elder brother, who was absorbed in spiritual matters.

Erkkara married Muriyath Parvathy Vaarasyaar when he was 22. They had four sons and five daughters. As was the custom then, he lived with his brother and nephews.

== See also ==
- Yaagam
- Śrauta
- Mezhathol Agnihothri
