= Vākyakaraṇa =

Astronomy almanac

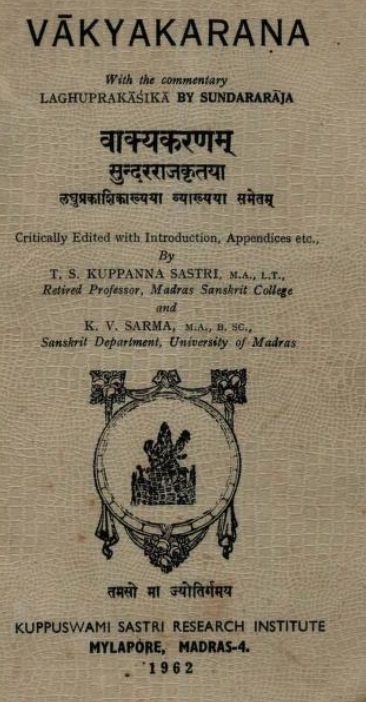
Cover page of Vakyakarana

Vākyakaraṇa is the source book of Vākyapañcāṅga which is a type of almanac popular among Tamil speaking people of South India. In Vākyapañcāṅga, the positions of the celestial entities and the timings of celestial events as obtained using the computational methods expounded in the text Vākyakaraṇa. These methods make use of astronomical tables compiled centuries ago. Each entry in such tables is in the form of a vākya, that is, a sentence in Sanskrit, and it represents some numerical value encoded using the kaṭapayādi scheme. Different sets of such vākya-s have been compiled for different celestial entities. One such set is Cāndrvākya-s which is a set of 247 values relating to the position of the Moon. The original set of Cāndrvākya-s are attributed to the legendary Kerala astronomer Vararuci. These were later revised by Mādhava of Saṅgamagrāma, another legendary astronomer and mathematician from Kerala. Such collections of vākya-s have been compiled in respect the five planets Mercury, Mars, Venus, Jupiter and Saturn. It may be noted that these vākya-s themselves are not part of the Vākyakaraṇa.

The authorship of the work has not been fully established. However, internal evidences suggest that the author should be somebody hailing from Kanchi in the Tamil country. The date of composition has been determined as c.1282 CE. Vākyakaraṇa has been commented upon by Sundararāja, a contemporary of Nīlakaṇṭha Somayājī (1444 – 1545)) the author of Tantrasamgraha.

Even though Vākyakaraṇa is the source book of Vākyapañcāṅga, almanac makers now do not use this work directly. They make use of later modern adaptions of the work like Jyotiṣa Gaṇita Śāstram by Mūnāmpaṇṇai Kṛṣṇa Jyosyar and Parahita Gaṇitaṃ by Swamy Ayyangar of Karayur.

== Contents ==
Most of the manuscripts of Vākyakaraṇa are divided into five chapters. However, there is one manuscript that contains an additional sixth chapter and it is believed to a later interpolation. The first chapter is concerned with computations involving the positions of the Sun, the Moon and the Rāhu, the second chapter with the planets, the third chapter with problems involving time, position and direction, the fourth chapter with eclipses and the fifth chapter with the rising and setting of the Mahāpāta-s.

T. S. Kuppanna Sastri and K. V. Sarma have critically assessed the contents of the work thus:

"Being a Karaṇa intended for practical use, ease of computation is the aim, which means that too much accuracy cannot be expected in the work. The vākya-s are given to the nearest minute. The differences between the vākya-s are so great that interpolation gives values several minutes off the correct values. The sines are given for 15 degree intervals and the declination of points on the ecliptic for five degree intervals. The methods of computing the circumstances of the eclipses and the Mahāpāta-s are rough and can only give results not very accurate."

== Additional reading ==
- The full text of Vākyakaraṇa with the Laghuprakāśikā commentary by Sundararāja critically edited with introduction, English translation and appendices by T. S. Kuppanna sastri and K. V. Sarma is available for free download in the Internet Archive. the appendices of the downloadable version contain the full set of vākya-s in respect of the Moon and the five planets.

T. S. Kuppanna Sastri and K. V. Sarma (1962). Vakya Karana with the commentary Laghuprakasika by Sundararaja. Madras (Chennai): Kuppanna Sastri Research Institute.

- For a critical study of the contents of Vākyakaraṇa: K Chandra hari (2001). "Vakyakarana - A study". Indian Journal History of Science. 36 (3): 127–149.

== See also ==
- Vākyapañcāṅga
