= Vaduthala Nair =

Character in Malayalam Folklore

Vaduthala Nair, was a renowned social reformer and martial artist in Kerala, India.

Nair was one of the 12 children of Vararuchi, a Brahman, and his wife Panchami, a Paraya. According to Kerala folklore in the tale of Parayi petta panthirukulam, all of the 11 children of Vararuchi and Panchami were abandoned by the mother soon after birth, left behind by the couple while on a pilgrimage along the Nila River banks. Each child was taken in and raised by a family of a different caste or religion. Vaduthala Nair was taken in by the Kundully Nair family of Mezhathur, near Thrithala, he is the most well-known sibling, renowned for his martial arts, his status as a Nair soldier, and his protection of the poor. It is said that criminals and robbers feared him, as he was known to have saved a Namboothiri and his servant from robbers in the middle of a jungle.
