= Visvanatha Sastriyar =

Visvanatha Sastriyar (or Visvanathan) (1756–1845) was a Tamil poet and astronomer of Sri Lankan Tamil ancestry. Sir Emerson Tennent called him "the most celebrated astronomer in Ceylon".

== Early life ==
Visvanatha Sastriyar was born in Araly in the Vaddukoddai region near Jaffna to Narayana Sastri in a Tamil Brahmin family in 1756.

== As astronomer ==
Visvanathan published a yearly almanac or panchangam till his death. This almanac was known for its accuracy. Visvanathan was praised for his work and was awarded the sole privilege of being considered "Almanac Maker for His Majesty, George IV". Sir Emerson Tennent, in his book "Christianity in Ceylon", wrote of Visvanatha Sastriyar thus:

Visuvenathen was the most celebrated of the astronomers of Ceylon, in as much as he concentrated in his own person the accumulated science of his ancestors, who for nine generations had been cultivators of the same study

However, his predictions have also proved to be wrong on certain occasions. His prediction of a lunar eclipse on 21 March 1828 was wrong by fifteen minutes. His prediction of the character of the eclipse also proved to be wrong as the eclipse was only a three-eighths eclipse and not five-eighths as he had predicted.

== As poet ==
Visvanathan also composed a number of poetical works. Notable among them were a Chola-era mythological Mavaikuruvanji and Kurunathar Killividudutu a panegyric on the Hindu god Skanda.

== Death ==
Visvanatha Sastriyar died in 1845.
