= Vākyapañcāṅga =

Types of Tamil almanac

Vākyapañcāṅga is an almanac used in Tamil nadu and used by various tamil speaking community members across the world. Two types of almanacs are popular among the Tamil speaking people in India, and the world over, they are Vākyapañcāṅga and Thirugaṇita-pañcāṅga. The latter is also known as Dṛggaṇita pañcāṅga. This is not to be confused with the Dṛggaṇita pañcāṅga, the nearly unanimous choice of almanac of Malayalam speaking people, established by Vatasseri Parameshvara Nambudiri (c. 1380–1460) who was a major Indian mathematician and astronomer of the Kerala school of astronomy and mathematics founded by Madhava of Sangamagrama. The Vākyapañcāṅga is based on the astronomical data and computational methods propounded in the various Siddhānta texts like the Sūrya-Siddhānta and uses the text Vākyakaraṇa of anonymous authorship as the basic source book. The Thirugaṇita-pañcāṅga is based on the modern values of the various astronomical parameters and incorporates modern formulas and computational schemes. It was introduced by Chinthamani Ragoonatha Chary (1822 – 5 February 1880) an Indian astronomer attached to the then Madras Observatory.

== Vākyapañcāṅga ==
The name Vākyapañcāṅga comes from the fact that it is based on vākya-s. In this context, the word vākya means a Sanskrit sentence, often meaningless in the literary sense, which represent a numerical value encoded in the kaṭapayādi system. For example āyurārogyasaukhyam (आयुरारोग्यसौख्यम्) is the encoding of the number 1712210 in the kaṭapayādi system. Ancient Indian astronomers have compiled extensive tables of astronomical data and, for easy memorization, these data have been put together as collections of vākya-s encoded in the kaṭapayādi system. There are collections of such vākya-s in respect of the celestial entities like the Moon, the five planets, rāhu, etc. Vākyakaraṇa, the basic reference work for vākyapañcāṅga-s makes extensive use of these collections of vākya-s. According to Kuppanna Sastri and Sarma:"Vākyakaraṇa, being a karaṇa intended for practical use, ease of computation is the aim, which means that too much accuracy cannot be expected in the work. The vākya-s are given to the nearest minute. The differences between the vākya-s are so great that interpolation gives values several minutes off the correct values. The sines are given for 15 degree intervals and the declination of points on the ecliptic for five degree intervals. The methods of computing the circumstances of the eclipses and the Mahāpāta-s are rough and can only give results not very accurate." These inaccuracies are of course fully reflected in the Vākyapañcāṅga-s. Not only that the positions of stars are not where they are, but often due to the accumulation of errors Vākyapañcāṅga-s it predict eclipses when there will be none. Even when eclipse is predicted the first contact time varies by about more than an hour.. To illustrate, Vākyapañcāṅga-s predicted that a solar eclipse would occur on Avani 6 in 1871, but there was no eclipse anywhere on the said date.

In spite of the inaccuracies, there are large sections of the population who adhere to Vākyapañcāṅga-s to determine the auspicious times for conducting religious rites and festivals. The argument of the orthodox astrologers was that passage of time is unrelated to actual movement of celestial objects, and that reference to movement of celestial objects is only for ease of calculation. Performance of rituals according to Sāstra-s demanded no accuracy of accordance between the pañcāṅga and actual position of celestial objects. It was contented that accuracy and accordance with actual observation may be needed for Astronomy but not for computation of tithi, nakṣatra and other aspects for the purpose of performing rituals. One may use the modern technique for observational astronomy, but for ritual use, one should resort to the traditional computation of the position of stars, for ‘appointed time’ is crucial. If Vākyapañcāṅga is not followed, one may be misled from the ‘appointed time’ by the Dharmasāstra-s, even though one may be accurate in predicting the celestial event.

The great Ranganathaswamy Temple at Srirangam regularly publishes Vākyapañcāṅga-s every year. Sringeri Sharada Peetham also follows the Vākyapañcāṅga.

== Some Vākyapañcāṅga-s ==
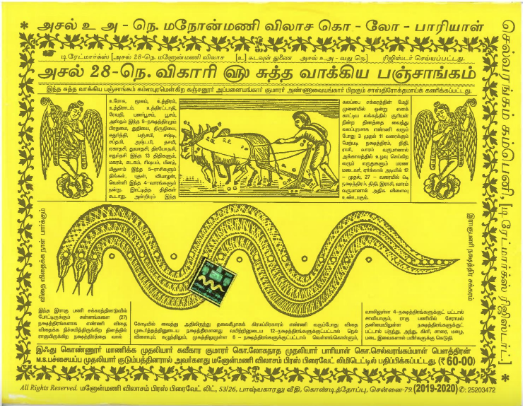
Cover image of Pambu Panchangam

Here are some examples of Vākyapañcāṅga-s:

- M. S. Pachiappa Mudaliar, 28 No. Pambu Sudhha Vakya Panchangam
- K. N. Narayanamoorthy Arcot Seetharama Iyer Panchangam
- Ramanathapuram Vakiya Tamil Panchangam
- N. R. Mahalingam Sivasakthi Panchangam,
- K. V. Kuppuswamy Hanuman Panchangam,
- M. V. Narayanan Hayagreevar Panchangam,
- G. S. Subramaniam Maruthukudi Panchangam,
- Patti Veerabhadra Dhyvagnyan Srisailam Panchangam,
- S. Gopalakrishnan Raghavendra Panchangam.

== See also ==
- Vākyakaraṇa
- Tirugaṇita-pañcāṅgam
