= Aithihyamala =

Folklore

Aithihyamala or Ithihyamala (Malayalam: ഐതിഹ്യമാല) (Garland of Legends) is a collection of century-old stories from Kerala that cover a vast spectrum of life, famous persons and events. It is a collection of legends numbering over a hundred, about magicians and yakshis, feudal rulers and conceited poets, kalari or Kalaripayattu experts, practitioners of Ayurveda and courtiers; elephants and their mahouts, tantric experts.

Kottarathil Sankunni (23 March 1855 – 22 July 1937), a Sanskrit-Malayalam scholar who was born in Kottayam in present-day Kerala, started documenting these stories in 1909. They were published in the Malayalam literary magazine, the Bhashaposhini, and were collected in eight volumes and published in the early 20th century.

It includes popular tales such as about the twelve children of Vararuchi and Parayi (a woman of Paraiyar caste), Kayamkulam Kochunni, Kadamattathu Kathanar among many others. The story of 12 children is popularly known as Parayi petta panthirukulam.

== Index of Eight Parts ==
Book I

1. Chempakassery Raajaavu
2. Kottayaththu Raajaavu
3. Mahaabhaashyam
4. Bhartṛhari
5. Adhyaathmaraamaayanam
6. Parayi petta panthirukulam
7. Thalakkulaththoor Bhattathiriyum Pazhur padippurayum
8. Vilwamangalaththu Swaamiyaar
9. Kaakkassery Bhattathiri
10. Muttassu Namboothiri
11. Puliyaampilly Namboori
12. Kallanthaattil Gurukkal
13. Kolaththiriyum Saamoothiriyum
14. Paandamparampaththu kodanbharaniyilaey uppumaanga
15. Mangalappilly Moothathum Punnayil Panikkarum
16. Kaaladiyil Bhattathiri
17. Venmani Namboorippaadanmaar
18. Kunchamanpottiyum Mattappally Namboothirippaadum
19. Vayakkara Achchan Mooss
20. Kozhikkottangaadi
21. Kidangoor Kandankoran

Book II

1. Kumaranalloor Bhagavathi
2. Thirunakkara Devanum aviduththaey kaalayum
3. Bhavabhoothi
4. Vaagbhataachaaryar
5. Prabhakaran
6. Paathaayikkara Namboorimaar
7. Kaaraattu Namboori
8. Viddi! Kushmaandam
9. Kunchan Nambiaarudaey Ulbhavam
10. Valiya Parisha Shankaranaaraayana Chaakyaar
11. Aazhuvaanchery Thampraakkalum Mangalathhtu Shankaranum
12. Naalaekkaattu Pillamaar
13. Kayamkulam Kochunni
14. Kaipuzha Raajniyum Pulinkunnu Desavum
15. Orantharjanaththintaey yukthi
16. Pazhur perumthrukkovil
17. Paakkanaarudaey bhaaryayudaey paathivrathyam
18. Randu Mahaaraajaakkanmaarudaey swabhaavavyathyaasam
19. Kochchunamboori
20. Chempakassery Raajaavum Maeppaththoor Bhattathiriyum
21. Vattapparampil Valiyamma
22. Vaikkaththu Thiruneelakantan

Book III

1. Kiliroorkunninmael Bhagavathi
2. Poonthaanaththu Namboori
3. Aalaththoor Nampi
4. Vayaskara Chathurvedi Bhattathiriyum Yakshiyum
5. Raamapuraththu Warrier
6. Chemprayezhuththachchanmaar
7. Kochchi Shakthanthampuraan Thirumanassukondu
8. Ammannoor Parameshwara Chaakyaar
9. Cheranalloor Kunchukkarthaavu
10. Kottarakkara Goshaala
11. Thaevalassery Nampi
12. Chila eeshwaranmaarudaey pinakkam
13. Parangottu Namboori
14. Paakkil Shaasthaavu
15. Kodungallur Vasoorimaala
16. Thripoonithara kshethraththilaey ulsavangal
17. Aaranmulamaahaathmyam
18. Konniyil Kochchayappan
19. Maanthrikanaaya Rawther

Book IV

1. Oorakaththu Ammathiruvadi
2. Swathithirunal Mahaaraajaavuthirumanassukondu
3. Pilaamanthol Mooss
4. Shasthamkottayum Kuranganmaarum
5. Mazhamangalaththu Namboori
6. Vayaskarakkudumbavum aviduththaey Shaasthaavum
7. Kaayamkulaththu Raajavintaey shreechakram
8. Kulappuraththu Bheeman
9. Mannadikkaavum Kampiththaanum
10. Shreekrishnakarnaamrutham
11. Kadamattathu Kathanar
12. Puruharinapuraeshamaahaathmyam
13. Tholakavi
14. Kunchukuttippilla sarwaadhikaaryakkaar
15. Achchankovilshaasthaavum Parivaaramoorththikalum
16. Avanaamanakkal Gopalan

Book V

1. Pallipuraththukaavu
2. Elaedaththuthykkaattu Moossanmaar
3. Kaipuzhathampaan
4. Kollam Vishaarikkaavu
5. Vayaskara Aaryan Narayananmooss avarkaludaey chikilsaanaipunyam
6. Chamkroththamma
7. Avanangaattu Panikkarum Chaaththanmaarum
8. Kuttanchery Mooss
9. Pallivaanapperumaalum Kiliroor Desavum
10. Kaadaamkottu Maakkam Bhagavathi
11. Oru europiyantheyantaey swamibhakthi
12. Sanghakkali
13. Kottarakkara Chandrashekharan

Book VI

1. Panayannaar kaavu
2. Uthram Thirunaal Thirumanassukondum Kathakali yogavum
3. Kaplingaattu Nambooriyum Deshamangalaththu Warrierum
4. Vijayadri Maahaathmyam
5. Naduvilaeppaattu Bhattathiri
6. Aaranmula Devanum Mangaattu Bhattathiriyum
7. Mundaempilly Krishna Maaraar
8. Mannaarassaala Maahaathmyam
9. Oru Swaamiyaarudaey shaapam
10. Pullankoottu Namboori
11. Panachchikkaattu Saraswathi
12. Vellaadu Namboori
13. Aaranmula Valiya Balakrishnan

Book VII

1. Chengannur Bhagawathi
2. Edavettikkaatthu Namboori
3. Payyannur graamam
4. Olassayil Vaettakkorumakan kaavu
5. Shabarimala Shaasthaavum Panthalaththu Raajaavum
6. Vaikkaththaey Paattukal
7. Perumpulaavil Kaelu Menon
8. Chempakassery Raajaavum Raajniyum
9. Vilwamangalaththu Swaamiyaar
10. Paambummaekkaattu Namboori
11. Kalidasan
12. Panthalam Neelakantan

Book VIII

1. Chittoor Kaavil Bhagavathi
2. Kalloor Namboorippaadanmaar
3. Thakazhiyil Shaasthaavum aviduththaey ennayum
4. Arackal Beebi
5. Thiruvizhaa Mahaadevanum aviduththaey marunnum
6. Pazhur perumthrukkovil
7. Thekkedathu kudumbakkaar
8. Mookkola Kshethrangal
9. Kumaramangalathhtu Namboori
10. Mandakkaattamanum kodayum
11. Thiruvattattaadhi Kesavan
