= Parayi Petta Panthirukulam =

Folktale in Kerala

Parayi Petta Panthirukulam (Malayalam: പറയി പെറ്റ പന്തിരുകുലം; transl. ml – transl. The twelve born of a Parayi woman), is a popular folktale in Kerala. According to this folktale, Vararuchi, one of the nine wise men of Emperor Vikramaditya’s (57 BCE- 78 AD) court married Panchami, a girl belonging to Paraya, a lower caste. The couple set out on a long pilgrimage. On the way, they had 12 children. Upon each delivery, Vararuchi enquired whether the baby had a mouth. If the wife said "yes", he would say, "God will appease the one with mouth" and would ask the wife to abandon the baby then and there and proceed. Eleven children were deserted, since they had a mouth. The tale goes that after the 12th birth, when Vararuchi asked whether the child had a mouth, the wife said he didn't have a mouth in the hope that she may get to raise at least that child. But when she looked at the child after saying that, the child indeed was seen to have been born without a mouth. Vararuchi consecrated the 12th child as a deity on top of a hill, and they proceeded on the pilgrimage.

The 11 abandoned children were adopted and brought up by 11 different families, from various sections of society. Following are the names of the families who are believed to have adopted the children:

1. Mezhathol Agnihothri (Namboothiri)
2. Pakkanar (Parayan)
3. Rajakan (Washerman)
4. Naranath Bhranthan [(A divine person who pretend to be mad)Ambalavasi Caste]
5. Karakkalamma (Royal Kshathriya woman, only girl born to the couple)
6. Akavoor Chathan (Farmer, later became a caretaker)
7. Vaduthala Nair (Nair Soldier)
8. Vallon (Pulaya)
9. Uppukottan (Muslim)
10. Paananaar (folk musician)
11. Perumthachan (Engineer, Architect)
12. Vayillakkunnilappan, (Hill Lord without mouth) the 12th child was born without a mouth. Vararuchi consecrated this child on a hill in Palakkad district of Kerala, which is now known as "Vaayillaakkunnilappan temple" located at Vayilyamkunnu Bhagavathi Temple, Kadampazhipuram.
