= Mezhathol Agnihothri =

Hindu Priest in Malayalam Folklore

Mezhathol Agnihothri is a figure in the folklore of Kerala who is credited for supposedly reviving the ancient Shrauta traditions in Kerala, India, in around the mid-first millennium CE. At that time, Buddhism and Jainism were displacing existing caste-based religious practices in the region. Mezhathol rejuvenated the ancient customs by performing 99 yagas. The Shrauta traditions still remain intact in Kerala today, maintained by the rigidly orthodox Nambudiri Brahmins.

== Yagas ==
Mezhathol Agnihothri began gathering interest in the yaga culture and proceeded to perform 99 yagas, one after the other. However only seven of the original 32 Nambudiri Graamams (Villages) agreed to assist Mezhathol, and today only these Graamams (Taliparamba, Alathur, Karikkad, Panniyur, Sukapuram, Peruvanam and Irinjalakkuda) have the right to perform Yaagam. 17 Nambudiri experts are required to perform yagas, and they come from Kalakandathur Griham, Maathur Griham, Kulukkamillaavur Griham, Chemmangad Griham, Pazhoor Griham, Muringoth Griham and Vella Griham.

It is believed that if a person performs 100 yagas, that person has the same status of Indran. After Mezhathol performed 99 yagas, Indran, worried that he may lose his power, requested Mezhathol not to perform the 100th yaga. Mezhathol declined, explaining that he was not performing the yagas for personal gain, but to retain the culture of yagas amongst Brahmins. At this, Indran gave Mezhathol and his seven associates the same status as himself.

=== Aadhyan Nambudiri ===
The assistance of 8 Nambudiri families (Griham) was recognised by Mezhathol Agnihotri and he classed these 8 families as the Ashtagrihathil Aadhyanmaar (Eight Elite Families). Members of these families are known as ''Aadhyan'' Nambudiris ("Aadhyan" literally means "the first one" in Malayalam). Aadhyans adopted the title of "Nambudiripad" to show their superior status. However in the subsequent centuries, several non-Aadhyan families (known as Aasyan Nambudiris) have also adopted the title of "Nambudiripad" in imitation of Aadhyan Nambudiris.

== See also ==
- Parayi petta panthirukulam
- Erkkara Raman Nambudiri
