= Kottarathil Sankunni =

Indian writer (1855–1937)

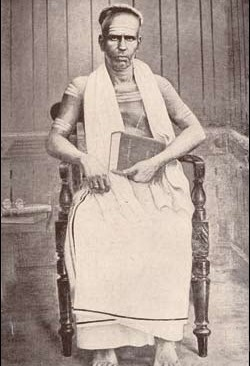
- Born: March 23, 1855
- Died: July 22, 1937 (aged 82)
- Occupation: Writer
- Spouse(s): Sreedevi Amma, Lakshmy Amma, Devaki Amma
- Relatives: Vasudevan Unni (father); Nangayya (mother)
- Writing career
- Genres: Novel, short Story
- Notable work: Aithihyamala
- Notable awards: Kavithilakan

Kottarathil Sankunni (born Vasudevan, 1855–1937) was an Indian writer of Malayalam literature. Best known as the author of Aithihyamala, an eight-volume compilation of century-old legends about Kerala, Sankunni's writings cover prose and poetry, including verses for Kathakali and Ottan Thullal. He was one of the founding members of Bhashaposhini Sabha founded by Kandathil Varghese Mappillai and was also involved with Bharata Vilasam Sabha, another literary initiative. He died on July 22, 1937.

== Biography ==
Kottarathil Sankunni was born on March 23, 1855, at Kodimatha, in Kottayam district of the south Indian state of Kerala (erstwhile Travancore) to Vasudevan Unni-Nangayya couple. The boy, whose name at birth was Vasudevan but was called Thanku, Sanku and later Sankunni, did his early schooling under the tutelage of a local teacher and later, studied Sanskrit under Manarkattu Sanku Warrier and traditional medicine under Vayskara Aryan Narayanan Mooss. He joined Malayala Manorama in 1890 as the editor of their poetry section during which time he tutored a few Britishers the language of Malayalam. In 1893, he was selected as a Malayalam teacher at M. D. Seminary High School, Kottayam.

Sankunni married for the first time in 1881 but after the death of his first wife, married Evoor Panaveliveettil Sreedevi Amma in 1887. he married twice more, the brides were Panaveli Lakshmy Amma and Pengali Thekkethu Devaki Amma. He died on 22 July 1937, at the age of 82.

== Legacy ==
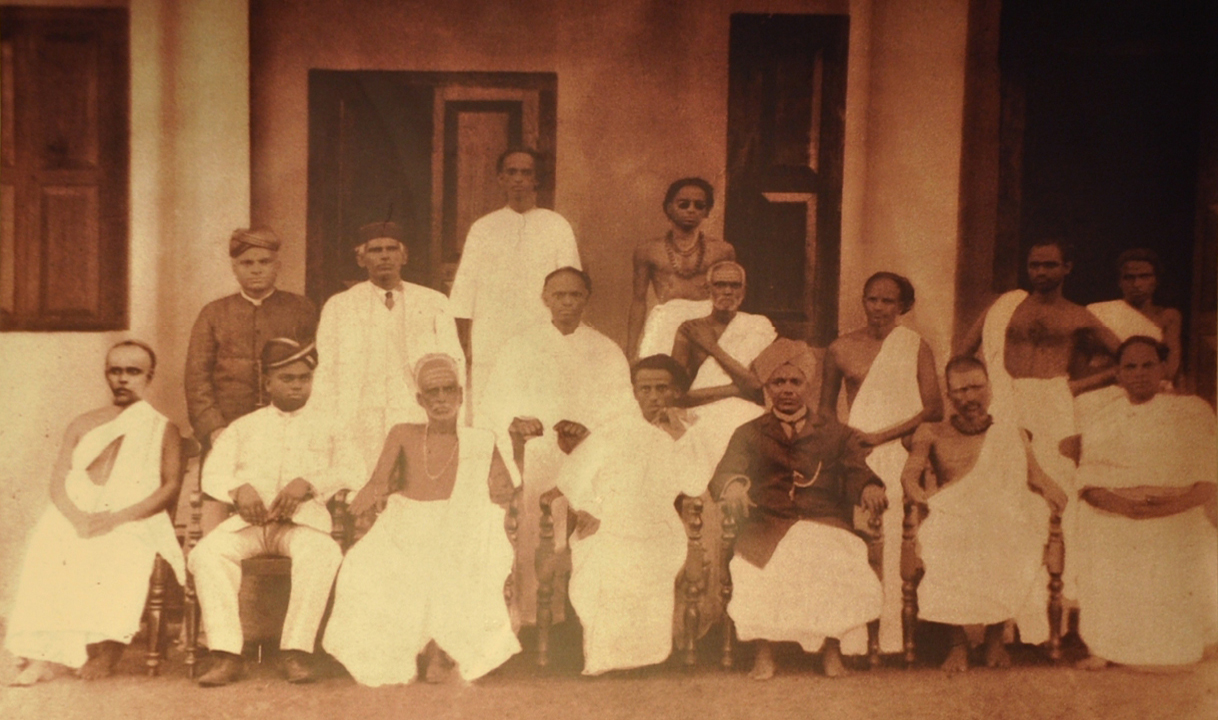
Bharatha Vilasam Sabha – Kottarathil Sankunni, Ulloor S. Parameswara Iyer, Kodungallur Kunjikkuttan Thampuran and Vallathol Narayana Menon are seen in the picture

Sankunni's contributions cover both prose and poetry, including Kathakali literature, Thullal, kilipattu, vanchipattu and other genres of literature. His works include:

- Aithihyamala, a collection of legendary stories including those about Kadamattathu Kathanar, Kayamkulam Kochunni, Parayi petta panthirukulam and others.
- Sreerama pattabhishekam (Kathakali)
- Adhdhyathmaramayanam (Translation)

He was also involved with two literary initiatives, the Bhashaposhini Sabha founded by Kandathil Varghese Mappillai and the Bharata Vilasam Sabha, an organization where most of the literary figures of that period were members.

== Aithihyamala ==
Sankunni started compiling the legends of Kerala in 1909 and it took over a quarter to a century for him to complete the work. Aithihyamala (Garland of Legends), once completed was an eight-volume compilation of legends and old stories, popular in Kerala over the centuries. The work comprises eight volumes, containing 126 chapters. It was first serialised in Bhashaposhini literary magazine. Later, it was published by the Reddiar Press in Quilon, in the early twentieth century. Kottarathil Sankunni Memorial Committee entrusted National Book Stall to reprint the work in 1974 and in 1991, D. C. Books published it in a new format. The book is known to have sold over 150,000 copies until 2004.

== Bibliography ==
=== Selected works ===
- Śaṅkuṇṇi, Koṭṭārattil (2015). Aithihyamala. Ḍi Si Buks. ISBN 9788126422906. OCLC 960468561.
- Śaṅkuṇṇi, Koṭṭārattil (1931). Kṣhēthr̲amāhātmyaṃ. Tr̥śśūr: Maṅgaḷōdayaṃ Pr̲ass. OCLC 43104218.
- Śaṅkuṇṇi, Koṭṭārattil (1935). Seemanthinīcharitaṃ: bhāṣānāṭakaṃ. Trichur: Keralodayam Press. OCLC 37527198.
- Śaṅkuṇṇi, Koṭṭārattil (1909). Kuchēlagōpālaṃ: nāṭakaṃ. Tr̥śśūr: Bhārativilāsaṃ Accukūṭaṃ. OCLC 38510750.
- Śaṅkuṇṇi, Koṭṭārattil (1980). Addhyātmarāmāyaṇaṃ (in Malayalam). Kottayam; Tiruvanantapuraṃ: Kottarathil Sankunni Memorial Committee; Distributors, Kar̲ant̲ Buks. OCLC 11496946.
- Śaṅkuṇṇi, Koṭṭārattil (1908). Lakṣmībhāīśatakaṃ: maṇipr̲avāḷaṃ. Tr̥śśūr: Bhāratavilāsaṃ Pr̲ass. OCLC 38510783.
- Śaṅkuṇṇi, Koṭṭārattil (1908). Māṭhamahīśhaśatakaṃ: maṇipr̲avāḷaṃ. Tr̥śśūr: Bhāratavilāsaṃ. OCLC 39133272.

=== Translations into English ===
- Śaṅkuṇṇi, Koṭṭārattil (1997). Tales from Kerala. Translated by Wood, Reade. India. OCLC 43779950.
- Koṭṭārattil Śaṅkuṇṇi (2016). Aithihyamaala: the great legends of Kerala. Translated by Śr̲īkumāri Rāmacandran. Mathrubhumi Books. ISBN 9788182666252. OCLC 1032243481.
- Śaṅkuṇṇi, Koṭṭārattil (2006). Tales once told: legends of Kerala adapted from Kottarathil Sankunni's Ithihyamala. Translated by Eraly, Abraham. New Delhi; New York, NY: Penguin Books. ISBN 978-0-14-309968-0. OCLC 76902803.
