= Perumthachan =

Ancient Indian carpenter

Perumthachan, also spelled Perunthachan (Peru/big, thachan/craftsman), meaning the master carpenter or the master craftsman, is an honorific title used to refer to an ancient legendary carpenter (Achari or Acharya), architect, woodcarver, and sculptor (stone and wood) from Kerala, India. Perumthachan is an important figure in the folklore of Kerala, and structures including the Shiva temple at Uliyannoor and the Valluvanad temple in Kerala are attributed to him.
