= Peruvanam =

- Neighbourhood
- Peruvanam, Thrissur, Kerala
- Coordinates: 10.4374°N 76.2120°E
- Country: India
- State: Kerala
- District: Thrissur
- Elevation: 41.37 m (135.7 ft)

Languages
  - Official: Malayalam, English
  - Speech: Malayalam, English
- Time zone: UTC+5:30 (IST)
- PIN: 680561
- Telephone code: +91487*******
- LS: Thrissur
- VS: Nattika

Peruvanam (Peruvanam Gramam) is a historical area of Brahmin settlement in central Kerala. In Kerala Sanskrit literature, the name "Peruvanam" is often Sanskritized as Puruvana meaning the forest where a sage named Puru lived and meditated. The name "Perumanam" is also used instead of Peruvanam.

== Boundaries ==
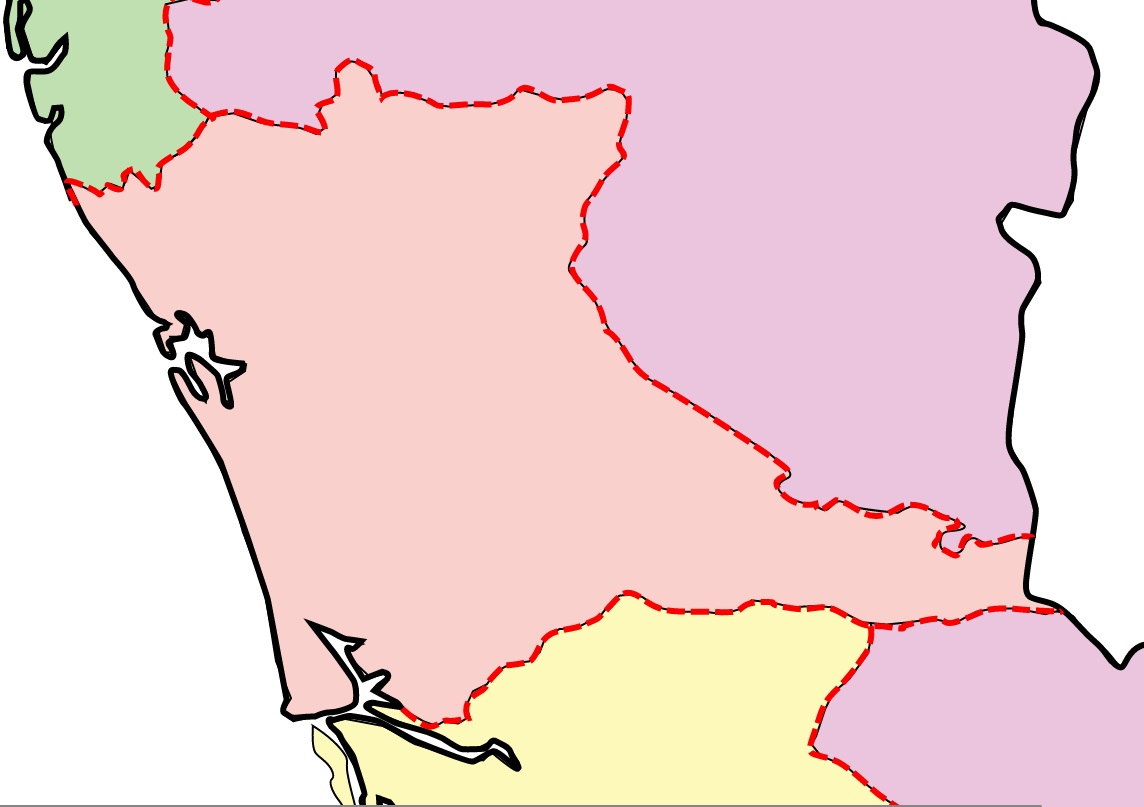
The four Sastha temples bounding Peruvanam Gramam

According to legends, Peruvanam was one of the 64 villages (Gramam-s) created by the mythological character Parashurama, the sixth avatar of Lord Vishnu, in the land reclaimed by him from the sea in the south-west coast of the Indian peninsula and donated to the Brahmins he had brought from other parts of India. As many as 32 of these Gramams are situated in the area between Gokarna in Karnataka and Chandragiri River (also known as Payasvini or Perumpuzha river) in Kasaragod district in Kerala. The remaining 32 Gramams are located in the region between Chandragiri River river and Kanyakumari in Tamil Nadu. This region overlaps most areas of present-day Kerala state. Peruvanam Gramam is nearly in the middle of the region in Kerala where the 32 Gramams lying to the south of the Chandragiri river are located.

The area referred to as Peruvanam has no clearly defined geographical boundaries. The area in Kerala bounded in the north by Bharathapuzha river and in the south by Periyar river is sometimes considered as the geographical extent of the traditional Peruvanam Gramam. There are other accounts about the boundaries of the Gramam. In these accounts, the Gramam is bounded in the east by the Sri Dharmasastha Temple at Kuthiran in the mountainous terrain in the eastern part of Thrissur district, in the north by the Sri Dharmasastha Temple at Akamala near Wadakkanchery, in the west by the Ayyappan Kavu Temple at Edathiruthy near Thriprayar and in the south by the Sastha Temple at Oozham near Kodungallur.

== History ==
The antiquity of the Peruvanam Gramam has been attested by several historical documents. The earliest historical reference to Peruvanam occurs in a Peruvanam Granthavari. This document refers to the year of starting of the Peruvanam Pooram as 583 CE. The year is indicated in the Kalidina of the starting of the Pooram which itself is encoded as "Ayathu Shivalokam Nah" in the famous Katapayadi system. Decoding this one gets the day of the starting of the Pooram as Kalidina 1345610 which translates to Kali year 3684 Meenam 27. As indication of antiquity, six Vattezhuthu and Malayalam inscriptions have been found in the temple. An 11th century inscription from Thiruvattoor in North Kerala refers to seven persons originally belonging to Peruvanam Gramam. A document dated 1169 CE containing a reference to a Brahmin from this Graman has been recovered from Kilimanoor. Peruvanam Kottam, the abode of the Lord of Peruvanam, figures along with nearby Oorakam in the Thrikkakkara inscription of Ko Indu Kothai Varman of tenth century CE.

== Namputhiri settlers ==
Presently, as many as 133 Namputhiri Illam-s or Mana-s (a mana or illam is a patrilineal clan of Naṃpūtiri-s or Malayali Brahmins all of whose members share the name of the Mana as the common family name; the word is also used to denote the house of a Naṃpūtiri or Malayali Brahmin), whose members live scattered across different parts of central Kerala, have been identified as descendants of the original settler families of the Peruvanam village. A few of the original settler Illam-s have become extinct. There is a sharp division among these families with regard to the rituals and customs they practice. Of the 133 Mana-s, the members of as many as 79 Mana-s are followers of the Yajurveda and associated rituals and the members of the remaining Mana-s pursue Rigveda and associated rituals.

The members of Peruvanam Gramam along with the members of Sukapuram Gramam (another Brahmin settlement legendarily created by Parashurama) enjoy a higher social ranking in certain matters. For example, the qualifications for the appointment of the Melsanthi (Chief Priest) of the great Sri Krishna Temple at Guruvayur stipulate that the candidate should be from Peruvanam or Sukapuram Gramams with Agnihotram and Bhattavrthi. This modern-day stipulation is proof enough that the myth and legend of the Peruvanam Gramam is a living tradition that influences and interferes in the life and times of contemporary Kerala society in a very concrete way.

== Peruvanam Temple ==
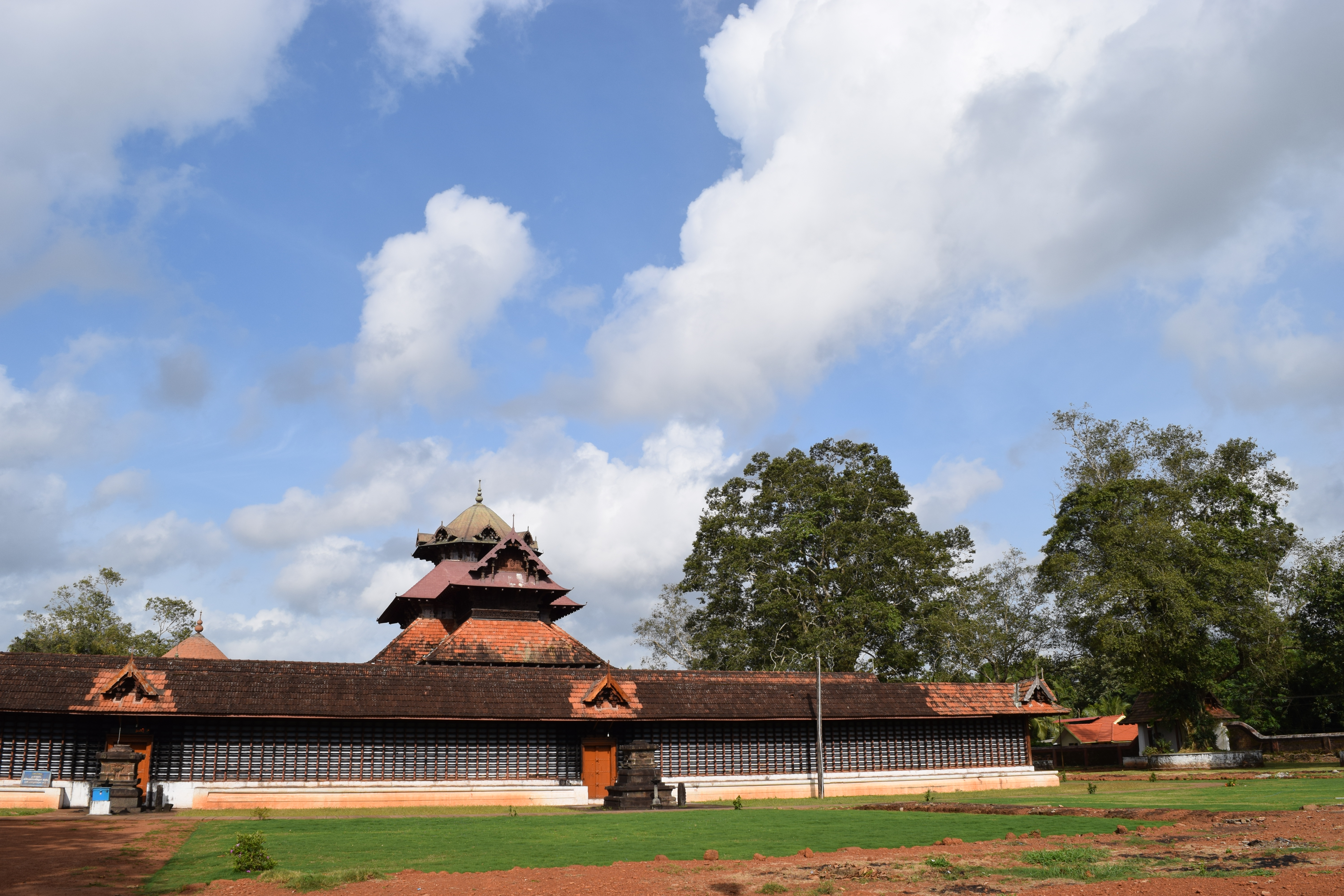
Peruvanam Mahadeva Temple

One very important fact about Brahmin settlements in Kerala was that they were centered around temples and the temple was synonymous with the settlement and vice versa. Peruvanam Gramam was no exception to this general rule and it got its name from the ancient Peruvanam Mahadeva Temple located nearly at the center of the geographical area of the Gramam. This temple, where God Shiva is worshiped, is now situated in Cherpu Gramapanchayath in Thrissur district in Kerala.

There are several iconographic, architectural and other specialties in this temple. The temple has two srikovil-s (sanctum sanctora). In one of these, the idol is in the form twin linga-s installed on the same pedestal which, according to one tradition, are assumed to represent Siva and Parvathi as Ardhanareesvara and which, according to another tradition, represent Sankara (Siva) and Narayana (Vishnu). The presiding deity of this sanctum sanctorum is locally referred to as Erattayappan ("Twin God"). The second srikovil is situated in the first floor of a three-storey structure, a tri-tala-vimana, adjacent to the other srikovil. The deity here is also Siva locally referred to as Madathilappan which may be loosely translated as the "God in the Tree House".

== Peruvanam Grama Utsavam (Pooram) ==
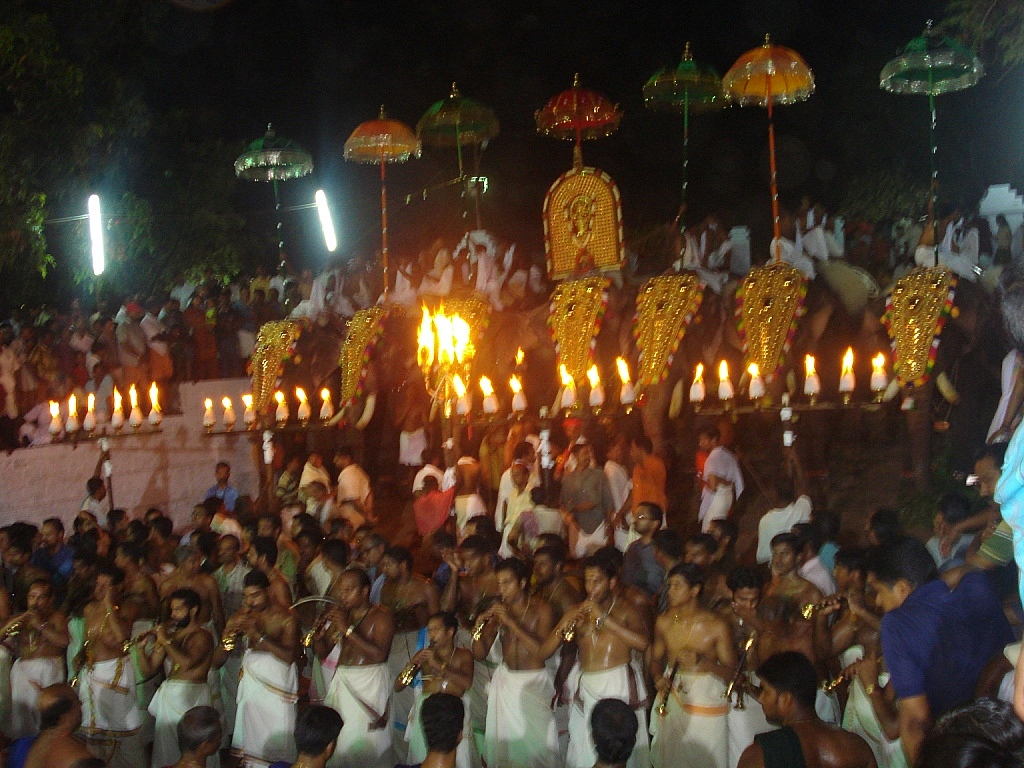
A view of Peruvanam Pooram

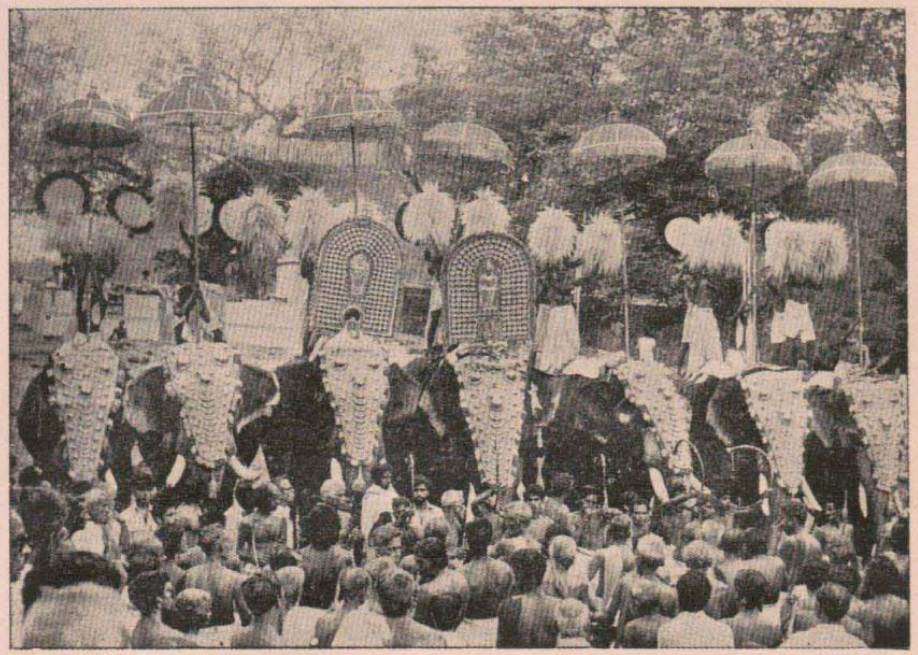
An old view of Peruvanam Pooram

Peruvanam Poooram, even though it is now known and celebrated as only a local temple festival sans the glory and fame of a mega-pooram like the Thrissur Pooram, was in the olden days a mega spectacle and the grand festival of Peruvanam Gramam. It was not just a temple Pooram with only one day's festivities, it was a festival, the Spring festival (Vasanthotsavam) lasting 28 days with the participation of all people in Peruvanam Gramam. Tradition has it that the festival used to commence with Koțiyēt on Utram nakṣatram in the Kuṃbhaṃ month with a Valiya Viḷakk (present-day Peruvanam Pooram) in Perumanam Mahadeva Temple on Pūyaṁ nakṣatram and Ārāțț (present-day Arattupuzha Pooram) on Pūraṃ nakṣatram. The 28 days commencing from Utram nakṣatram in the Kuṃbhaṃ month is even now observed as the festival season (Utsavakkālaṃ) in Perumanam Gramam with the performance of special rituals in temples. All the nooks and corners of Peruvanam Gramam, represented by the presiding deities of the local village temples, used to be participants of the festival. The number of such participating deities used be as high as 108. That the festival was a Gramam-wide affair is corroborated by another legend which asserts all residents of Peruvanam Gramam are mandatorily obliged to attend the Ārāțț and that if a resident of the Gramam was not found attending the Ārāțț, he could definitely be deemed to be dead and his post-death rituals should be carried out immediately!

According to a Peruvanam Granthavari, the year of starting of the Peruvanam Pooram was 583 CE. As already indicated earlier, the year is indicated by the words "āyātu śivalokaṃ naḥ" which is an encoding of a number in the Katapayadi system. Decoding this one gets the day of the starting of the Pooram as Kalidina 1345610 which translates to Kali year 3684 Meenam 27. The full verse runs as follows:

āyātu śivalokaṃ naḥ kalāviti vilokanāt
cintayā satbhirāraṃbhī devapūramahotsavaḥ

"With the thoughts that every be happy and contented, on Kali day āyātu śivalokaṃ naḥ (13,45,610), commenced the Peruvanam Pooram Utsavam."

Thus, as per this document, the Peruvanam Grama Utsavam has a history of more than fourteen centuries. Historical records chronicling the rise and decline of the Peruvanam Grama Utsavam are scanty. One event that dealt the near death blow to the Utsavam was the starting of the Thrissur Pooram in the year 1796 under the direction and control of Sakthan Thampuran, the then ruler of the erstwhile Cochin Kingdom. Royal patronage and support, and the fact it was being held in the middle of a town, added more glamor and prestige to Thrissur Pooram leading to a decline in importance to Peruvanam Pooram. However, during the last quarter of the twentieth century, with the support and encouragement of the State government, the Pruvanam and Arattupuzha Pooram-s witnessed a resurgence and now they are organised with much grandeur and huge popular participation.

== Gramam administration in the medieval times ==
There are no written records regarding how the affairs of Peruvanam Gramam were managed during various historical periods. For that matter, there are no such records regarding any of the remaining 63 Gramams that are supposed to have been created by Parashurama. However, from bits and pieces of information collected together from various sources like inscriptions on temple walls, few copper plate records and allusions in literary works historians have attempted to present a coherent account how a Gramam might have been administered in medieval times. The situation of Peruvanam Gramam was unlikely to different from this general pattern.

The activities in a Gramam, a Brahmin settlement, revolved around the temple. The Gramam property, whose collateral ownership was vested with the temples, was virtually the property of the Brahmins. The property of the temples, called Devasvam, and other temple affairs were looked after jointly by the Brahmin population of the Gramam. The Brahmin population of the Gramam constituted the "General Body" of the Gramam Administration. This was called Uralar a term even now used to denote the administrators/trustees of privately owned ancient temples in Kerala. Meetings of the General Body are convened to deliberate on very important matters affecting the administration. However, a group of Uralar-s, called Paratai (a corrupt form of the Sanskrit word Parishad), used to function like an executive committee and look after the day-to-day affairs of the temple. The exact nature of the constitution of this committee is not known. Kinship affiliation, property qualification, educational achievements and adherence to moral codes seem to have been the eligibity for being members of this committee. Although these bodies were largely autonomous, there was nominal control over them from above and at times of exigency, the control was exercised. The decisions of these bodies are followed strictly and those who violate the rules are punished severely. Punishments included ex-communication and confiscatio of all properties. The functions of the bodies include management of the properties belonging to the temple, proper utilisation of the income accrued from the properties, settlement of disputes among Uralar-s and between Urala-s and tenants and collection of revenue and its remittance to the royal treasury.

== People from Peruvanam Gramam in Kerala Literature ==
Peruvanam Gramam was a fertile ground for the pursuit of intellectual and literary activities. This is evidenced by the popularity and spread of the large number of literary, astronomical, astrological and other creative works composed by persons who have identified themselves as belonging to this Gramam. One can see several references to such works in the classic multi-volume history of Kerala literature written by late Ulloor S. Paramevara Ayyar. The following is a necessarily incomplete compilation of such references.

1. Pattathu Vasudeva Bhattathiri (9th century CE) (Ulloor S. Parameswara Ayyar, Kerala Sahithya Charithram Vol I, pp.113-124), believed to be a contemporary of Kulasekhara Alvar: Yudhiṣṭhiravijayaṃ, Tripuradahanaṃ, Śourīkatha, Vāsudevavijayaṃ, Gajendramokṣaṃ, Naḷodayaṃ
2. Mazhamangalam Sankaran Namputhiri (1494-1570) (Ulloor S. Parameswara Ayyar, Kerala Sahithya Charithram Vol. II, pp.269-272): Gaṇitasāra (astronomy), Candragaṇitakrama (astronomy), Ayanacalanādigaṇitakrama (astronomy), Jāatakakrama (horoscopy), Praśnamāla with Bhāṣā (astrological query), Ceriya Kāaladīpakaṃ (short Kāaladīpakaṃ), Valiya Kāaladīpakaṃ (long Kāaladīpakaṃ), Jātakasāra in Sanskrit (astrology), Jātakasāra in Malayalam (astrology), Commentaries on Pañjabodha, Laghubhāskarīya, Muhūrtapadavī (all called Bālasaṅkaraṃ), Pañjabodhārthadarpaṇa
3. Mazhamangalam Narayanan Namboodiri (son of Mazhamangalam Sankaran Namputhiri) (Ulloor S. Parameswara Ayyar, Kerala Sahithya Charithram Vol. II pp.293-301 and Vol. II, pp.417-431): Books - Dārikavadham, Vyavahāramālā, Pārvathīstuti, Rāja Ratnāvalīyaṃ, Rāsakrīdā Kāvyaṃ, Mahiṣamangalaṃ Bhāņaṃ, Uttararāmāyaṇa Caṃpu, Uparāga Kriyākramaṃ, Smārta Prāyaśchitta Vimarśanaṃ. Caṃpu-s - Naishadham, Rajarathnāvalīyaṃ, Kotiyavirahaṃ, Bāṇayudhhaṃ. Brāhmaṇi songs - Rāsakrīda, Thirunṛttaṃ, Dārikavadhaṃ, Viṣṇumāyācritaṃ, Pārvatistuti, Satīsvayaṃvaraṃ.
4. Kirangattu Jayanthan Namputhirippad (c.1650 CE) (Ulloor S. Parameswara Ayyar, Kerala Sahithya Charithram Vol. III pp.210-213): Ṣoḍaśakriyākārikā, Āśoucakeraļī.
5. Arur Madhavan Atithiri (1765 - 1838) (Ulloor S. Parameswara Ayyar, Kerala Sahithya Charithram Vol. III pp.482-484): Uttaranaişadhaṃ, Subhadrāharaṇaṃ.
6. Kallur Neelakanthan Namputhirippad (1726 - 1835) (Ulloor S. Parameswara Ayyar, Kerala Sahithya Charithram Vol. III pp.543-547): Bālivijayaṃ, Madhukaiṭabhavadhaṃ, Svāhāsvayaṃvaraṃ, Sumukhīsvayaṃvaraṃ (all Āttakatha-s), Ajāmiḷmokșaṃ (Kaikoṭṭikkaḷppāṭṭ).

== Peruvanam Ward! ==
In contemporary times, a small geographical area in a Grama Panchayath in Thrissur district has been named after the legendary sprawling Peruvanam Gramam! Ward 9 of Cherpu Gramapanchayath in Thrissur district is now known as Peruvanam.

== Additional reading ==
- A meticulously detailed account of the architecture, rituals, history and legends of Peruvanam Mahadeva Temple is available at Peruvanam Shiva temple

.
