= Pañcabodha =

Sanskrit treatises on astronomy

Pañcabodha is the title of several different Sanskrit treatises on astronomy and mathematics composed by members of the Kerala school of astronomy and mathematics. All these works are karaṅa texts, that is, books which explain the various computations in astronomy especially with regard to those related to the preparation of Panchangam-s (calendar). They are essentially manuals of computations. The authorship of only three Pañcabodha-s have been identified.

The Pañcabodha-s generally contain five sections dealing with five topics. But this is not a strict rule. There are Pañcabodha-s which treat less than five topics and which treat more than five topics. The topics treated are not always the same. However many of them treat the five advanced topics in traditional Indian astronomy, namely, Vyātīpāta (computation of the instants at which the sum of the (true) longitudes of the Sun and the Moon amounts to half a circle), Grahaṇa (computation of eclipses), Chāyā (shadow computations), Śṛṅgonnati (the computation of the elevation of the lunar horn, or the angle between the line of cusps and the horizontal plane) and Mauḍhya (computation of the instants when a planet becomes invisible due to its direction/longitude being close to that of the Sun).

== The works titled Pañcabodha and their commentaries ==
The various Pañcabodha-s are listed below. Following K. V. Sarma, the various texts are identified by assigning them numbers written in Roman numerals.

1. Pañcabodha I (also called Prakīrṇasaṅgraha) by anonymous author: Has a commentary in Malayalam also of anonymous authorship. The work has been published with a modern commentary in Malayalam by Kanippayyoor Sankaran Namputirippad, by Panchangam Press, Kunnamkulam, Kerala.
2. Pañcabodha II by anonymous author: Has a Malayalam commentary, called pañcabodhakriyākrma by Mahishamangalam Sankaran Namputiri.
3. Pañcabodha III by Puthumana Somayaji: Divided into five section dealing with Vyātīpāta, Grahaṇa, Chāyā, Śṛṅgonnati and Mauḍhya. Has an anonymous Malayalam commentary.
4. Pañcabodha IV by anonymous author: Has five sections dealing with Vyātīpāta, Grahaṇa, Chāyā, Śṛṅgonnati and Mauḍhya in 105 verses. This has several commentaries.
  1. Laghuvivṛtī by Nārāyaṇa (1529 CE)
  2. Pañcabodhārpadarpaṅaṃ by Mahishamangalam Sankaran Namputiri
  3. Bālasaṅkaraṃ by Mahishamangalam Sankaran Namputiri
  4. Pañcabodhakriyākrama by anonymous author
5. Pañcabodha V by Purușotttama
6. Pañcabodha VI by anonymous author. Has commentary in Malayalam called Pañcabodhaṃ Bhāșā of anonymous authorship.
7. Pañcabodha VII by anonymous author. treats the topics Vyātīpāta, Grahaṇa, Chāyā, Śṛṅgonnati and Mauḍhya. Has a commentary in Malayalam.
8. Pañcabodha VIII by anonymous author. The work is in a mixture of Sanskrit and Malayalam languages.
9. Pañcabodha IX by anonymous author.
10. Pañcabodha X by also calledPañcabodhagaṇitaṃ Bhāṣā. the text is in Malayalam.
11. Pañcabodha XI by anonymous author. Has a commentary in Malayalam by Vāsuṇṇi Mūssatu of Veḷḷānaśśeri

== See also ==
- List of astronomers and mathematicians of the Kerala school
