= Upagraha =

Shadow planets in Hindu astrology

In Jyotiṣa or Indian astrology, the term Upagrāha (Sanskrit: उपग्रह) refers to the so-called "shadow planets" (Sanskrit: छायाग्राह, chāyāgrāha) that are actually mathematical points, that are used for astrological evaluation. Upagrāha is a generic term used for two distinct and different calculations. One type of Upagrāha called Aprakāśa (अप्रकाश) is calculated from the degree of the Sun. Another type is more generally called Upagrāha or Kālavelā (कालवेला) is calculated by dividing duration of diurnal sky (from sunrise to sunset) or the duration of the nocturnal sky (from sunset to sunrise) into eight parts. The classic writers like Parāśara, Varāhamihira and later writers like Venkateśa Śarma, author of Sarvartha Chintamani, all classify the Upagrāhas in various ways.

== Overview ==
The Vedic astrology is primarily based on the calculation of mathematical points. For instance, the Yoga, also referred to as the fifth part of Panchangam, is the sum of the combined longitudes of the Sun and Moon. Specifically, Upagraha is based on the longitude of the Sun so that astrological insights involving it needs the calculation of the sun's path in relation to other planets. For example, Rāhu and Ketu are determined according to the intersection of the sun and moon's paths in the sky. This serves a number of purposes and one of the most important of these is the determination of the power wielded by the upagraha to provide benefit or harm. For example, an upagrāha's interaction with Dhūma will result in excessive heat, risks of fire, and mental anguish.

Mantreśvara in the 25th chapter of his Phaladīpika deals with the nine traditional upagrāhas; the nine upagrāhas are – Māndi (मान्दि), Yamakaṇṭaka (यमकण्टक), Ardhaprahāra (अर्द्धप्रहार), Kāla (काल), Dhūma (धूम), Vyatipāta (व्यतीपात), Paridhi (परिधि), Indradhanu (इन्द्रधनु) and Upaketu (उपकेतु). Gopsh Kumar Ojha clarifies that Māndi is Gulika (गुलिक). With the exception of Yamakantaka the rest eight upagrahas are malefics and produce bad results. Yamakantaka is powerful in conferring benefits same as Jupiter but the other eight have evil influences in the bhavas (houses) they are found to occupy.

== Aprakāśa Upagrāha calculation ==
Name	Other Name(s)	Calculation	Distance from Sun
धूम (Dhūma)	-	133°20’ + Sun	+ 133°20’
व्यतीपात (Vyatīpāta)	पात (Pāta)	360° – Dhūma	+ 226°40’
परिवेष (Pariveṣa)	परिधि (Paridhi )	180° + Vyatīpāta	+ 46°40’
इन्द्रचाप (Indracāpa)	चाप (Cāpa), कोदन्द (Kodanda)	360° – Pariveṣa	+ 313°20’
उपकेतु (Upaketu)	सिखि (Sikhi)	16°40’ + Indracāpa	+ 330°00’

The resulting calculations will always leave Dhūma in opposition (180°) to Indracāpa and Vyatīpāta in opposition to Pariveṣa. All the Aprakāśa Upagrāhas are always in a fixed distance from the Sun.

== Kālavelā Upagrāha calculation ==
=== Daytime 8 part division ===
Daytime between Sunrise and Sunset
Weekday	1st Part	2nd Part	3rd Part	4th Part	5th Part	6th Part	7th Part	8th Part
Sunday	Su	Mo	Ma	Me	Ju	Ve	Sa	-
Monday	Mo	Ma	Me	Ju	Ve	Sa	-	Su
Tuesday	Ma	Me	Ju	Ve	Sa	-	Su	Mo
Wednesday	Me	Ju	Ve	Sa	-	Su	Mo	Ma
Thursday	Ju	Ve	Sa	-	Su	Mo	Ma	Me
Friday	Ve	Sa	-	Su	Mo	Ma	Me	Ju
Saturday	Sa	-	Su	Mo	Ma	Me	Ju	Ve

=== Nighttime 8 part division ===
Nighttime between Sunset and Sunrise
Weekday	1st Part	2nd Part	3rd Part	4th Part	5th Part	6th Part	7th Part	8th Part
Sunday	Ju	Ve	Sa	-	Su	Mo	Ma	Me
Monday	Ve	Sa	-	Su	Mo	Ma	Me	Ju
Tuesday	Sa	-	Su	Mo	Ma	Me	Ju	Ve
Wednesday	Su	Mo	Ma	Me	Ju	Ve	Sa	-
Thursday	Mo	Ma	Me	Ju	Ve	Sa	-	Su
Friday	Ma	Me	Ju	Ve	Sa	-	Su	Mo
Saturday	Me	Ju	Ve	Sa	-	Su	Mo	Ma

=== Mapping the Kālavelā Upagrāha by Graha ===
The table below shows how the five Kālavelās correlate to five of the Grahas ("Su" for Sun, "Ma" for Mars, "Me" for Mercury, "Ju" for Jupiter, "Sa" for Saturn). Use this abbreviation of the Grahas to find the index of the 1/8th part of each Kālavelā in the daytime and nighttime tables above. If the intention is to calculate Kāla, use "Su" (Sun) in the tables above, if Gulika, use "Sa" (Saturn) to identify the index of the part sought.

Devanāgarī	Name	Graha
काल	Kāla	Su
मृत्यु	Mṛtyu	Ma
अर्धप्रहर	Ardhaprahara	Me
यमघण्ट्क	Yamaghaṇṭka	Ju
गुलिक	Gulika	Sa

The calculation steps below involve calculating units of time. In the Indian classics Ancient Indian units of time (kāla vyavahāra) were used, but modern units (24-hour day) can be used as well.

=== Identify the Diurnal and Nocturnal duration ===
1. If the birth occurred before sunrise, find the time of sunset on the previous day.
  Find the duration of the time between that previous day's sunset and this day's sunrise. This duration is called ratrimāna.
2. If the birth occurred after sunrise, during daytime (before sunset), find the time of sunrise the same day.
  Find the duration of the time between that sunrise and sunset. This duration is called dinamāna.
3. If the birth occurred after sunset, find the time of sunrise the next day.
  Find the duration of the time between sunset of this day and sunrise the next day. This duration is called ratrimāna.

=== Division of Diurnal and Nocturnal duration ===
4. If the birth occurred before sunrise, use the nighttime table for the previous day.
  If the birth occurred between sunrise and sunset, use the daytime table for the same day
  If the birth occurred after sunset, use the nighttime table for the same day
5. Divide the duration (dinamāna or ratrimāna) by 8.
6. Multiply the 1/8th sum with the number of the part where the corresponding Graha is.

=== The Position of the Kālavelā ===
7. If the birth occurred before sunrise, add the results from above to the time of sunset the day before.
  If the birth occurred between sunrise and sunset on the same day, add the results from above to the time of same day sunrise.
  If the birth occurred after sunset on the same day, add the results from above to the time of same day sunset.
8. The Ascendant (rising degree) of the resulting time will be the degree of the Kālavelā.

== Rising time of Upagrahas ==
Māndi’s rising is got by firstly finding out the duration of day and night; if the duration is equal i.e. of thirty ghatis each (one ghati=24 minutes), Māndi would rise at the end of ghatis 26 on Sunday, at the end of ghatis 22 on Monday, at the end of ghatis 18 on Tuesday, at the end of ghatis 14 on Wednesday, at the end of ghatis 10 on Thursday, at the end of 6 ghatis on Friday, and at the end of 2 ghatis on Saturday. In the case of "night-births" the 5th of that particular weekday will have to be considered, and if the day and night durations vary then the rising of Māndi will have to be altered proportionately. The rising times of Kala during day-time on weekdays are in order at the end of ghatis 2, 26, 22, 18, 14, 10 and 6; those of Yamakantaka are at the end of ghatis 18, 14, 10, 6, 2, 26 and 22, and those of Ardhaprahar are at the end of ghatis 14, 10, 6, 2, 26, 22, 18. Dhooma is got by adding 4 signs 13 degrees and 20 minutes to the Sun's latitude; Vyatipata is got by subtracting the figures for Dhooma from 12 signs; Paridhi is obtained by adding six signs to the figures for Vyatipata; Indradhanu or Kodanda is got by subtracting Paridhi from 12 signs; and Upaketu is got by adding 16 degrees 40 minutes to Indradhanu. The simpler method for determining Māndi’s rising sign is - For day born, the duration of the day (Dinamāna) divided by 8 gives eight parts each part governed by a planet; the first part is ruled by the day-lord. For night born, the first part is ruled by the 5th planet in the given order; the sign rising in the east in the part ruled by Saturn is Māndi’s rising sign.

== General effects ==
Mantresvara tells us:-

गुलिकस्य तु संयोगे दोषान्सर्वत्र निर्दिशेत् |
यमकण्टकसंयोगे सर्वत्र कथयेच्छुभम् ||

" Wherever Gulika is in conjunction (with a planet), in all those (instances), evil has to be predicted; whenever Yamakantaka is associated, good has to be expected."

He further clarifies that Gulika, which is Saturn in effect, is more powerful in giving bad results, the rest produce half of the evil it produces.

If Gulika (Mandi) is found situated in the Janma Lagna then the person will be a thief, hot-tempered, cruel, disrespectful, unintelligent, uneducated, heavy eater, not stoutly built, not long-lived, have defective eyesight and no sons. Situated in the 2nd house, Gulika makes one harsh in speech, misbehaved, quarrelsome, unreliable, unreasonable and illogical in thought and deeds, and suffer from want of wealth. If Gulika is in the 3rd house the person will be arrogant, hot-tempered, greedy, a loner, fearless, impervious, a show-off who derives no happiness through brothers. The 4th house Gulika makes one devoid of relatives and friends, devoid of wealth and conveyance. If Gulika is in the 5th house the person will be evil-minded and evil-tempered, unsteady and short-lived; if it is in the 6th house then one will be fond of the occult and the mysterious, brave, victorious and blessed with a very able son. If Gulika is in the 7th house the person will be quarrelsome, unfriendly towards all, envious, possess little knowledge and understanding and much married. Gulika situated in the 8th house makes one short-statured with a defective face, appearance, eyesight and speech. The 9th house Gulika does not give an able father, guide or teacher or son; if it is in the 10th house then the person engages in evil and unworthy deeds and is not generous. The 11th house Gulika gives happiness, a commanding overbearing personality and good sons. Gulika occupying the 12th house makes one spend recklessly, lose wealth and suffer poverty. The rising sign in the Janam lagna will be a trikonasthana counted from the sign occupied by Gulika or the navamsa occupied by Gulika. Gulika in conjunction with the Sun indicates that the father will be short-lived, in conjunction with the Moon proves harmful for mother, in conjunction with Mars makes brothers unfortunate and unhelpful and separation from brothers, in conjunction with Mercury it makes one a fool or mentally ill, in conjunction with Jupiter, unscrupulous, in conjunction with Venus it makes one seek women of ill-repute, in conjunction with Saturn it makes one suffer many calamities, ailments, leprosy and be short-loved, and in conjunction with Rahu or Ketu gives infections and diseases and imbalance. If a person is born with Gulika situated in Tyajyakaala i.e. in Vishaghati or Vyatipata, Vaidhrti, Kulika, Ardhyaama, Paatayoga, Vishkumbha yogas or Bhadrakarana, Kshya-tithi or Vrddhi-tithi, the person even though born in a royal family will remain a daridra and a beggar.

The planet in conjunction with Yamakantaka and the bhava occupied by it flourish, they give good results. Ardhaprahār situated in benefic vargas in the bhava that has gained more benefic bindus in the Ashtakavarga gives very good results. The rest produce evil results. The good or bad indicated by these Upagrahas is experienced during the course of the dashas of the lords of the bhavas they happen to be in and according to the status of their dispositors. If the dispositor of Gulika is in a kendra or a trikona vested with requisite strength in own or exaltation or friendly sign then one possesses a pleasing personality, is popular and famous and enjoys the benefits of Raja yoga, he becomes a powerful ruler. The kendras and the trikonas not occupied by taragrahas are indicative of a turbulent life; the chayagrahas tenanting the kendras in particular cause immense pain.

== Rectification of rising sign in lagna ==
Kalidasa in his Uttara Kalamrita recommends the use of Mandi for the purpose of Lagna-shuddhi. He states – find out the rasis and the navamsas occupied by Mandi and the Moon, the rising lagna at the time of birth will be in the sign occupied by Mandi or the Moon or in the 7th sign or in the 5th or in the 9th from these two or from the navamsa occupied, whichever is stronger.
