= Akamala Machad Mountain Ranges =

Mountain range in Kerala, India

Geography
- Location: Thrissur district, Kerala, India

Akamala Machad Mountain Range is located in the North Eastern part of Thrissur district in Kerala, India. Vazhani wildlife sanctuary and Vazhani Dam are located in the South East end of this mountain ranges. Human Settlement is done in the downhills of this mountain ranges all around. Famous temples like Uthralikkavu and Akamala Sastha Temple are located in the downhills of this mountains.

Tiger, deer, and peacock inhabit the forests. It can be considered as the part of Western Ghats. Many small peaks and waterfalls are scattered in these mountains and get filled with rain water in the monsoons and become local attractions. Asuramkund, Thoomanam are examples of such waterfalls. The peaks are seen elevated from the newly built Wadakkanchery overbridge for a traveller from Thrissur to Shoranur.
