= Asurankundu Dam =

Dam in Mullurkara, Thrissur, Kerala, India

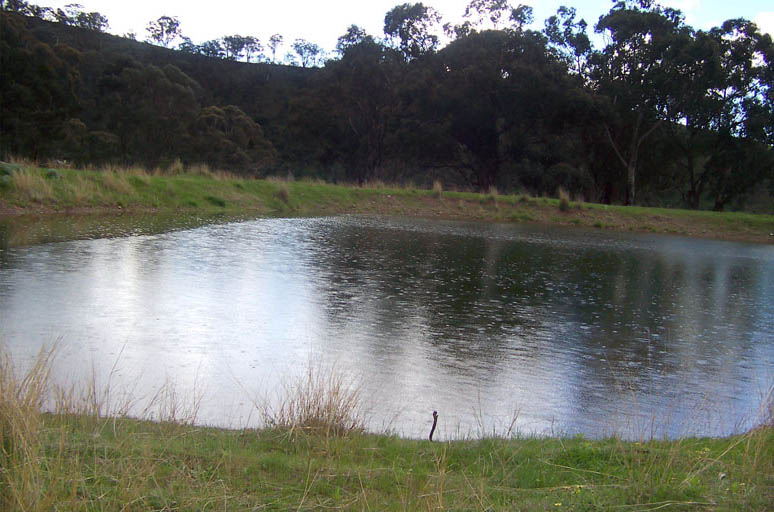

- Location within India Location within Kerala
- Official name: Asurankundu Dam
- Country: India
- Location: Mullurkara, Thrissur
- Coordinates: 10.685232°N 76.295527°E
- Purpose: Irrigation
- Status: Active
- Owner: Panchath

Dam and spillways
- Type of dam: Check dam

Asurankund Dam is a check dam located on the Chelakkara River in the Indian state of Kerala. It is located in Mullurkara Panchayat in Thrissur district.

The dam at Asurankundu is about 30 km from Thrissur. If one turns right off the Vadakkanchery-Mulloorkara road and follows the forest path for some distance, they will reach the check-post of the forest department. The permission to go further inside and closer to the dam can be obtained here.

Asurankundu is on the northern side of the Peechi-Vazhani wildlife sanctuary. The Asurankundu dam serves the purpose of collecting the water coming out from the forests and hills surrounding it. There are recommendations to include the Asurankundu dam also in the tourism corridor involving the Peechi-Vazhani-Poomala dams. Boat rides and a hanging bridge are being considered.

The dam belongs to the irrigation department and the road to the forest department. There is a two-kilometer walk into the forest. During summers, trekking is discouraged as even a small spark can result in wildfires and the entire forest could be destroyed. The best time to visit is the rainy season.

== Gallery ==
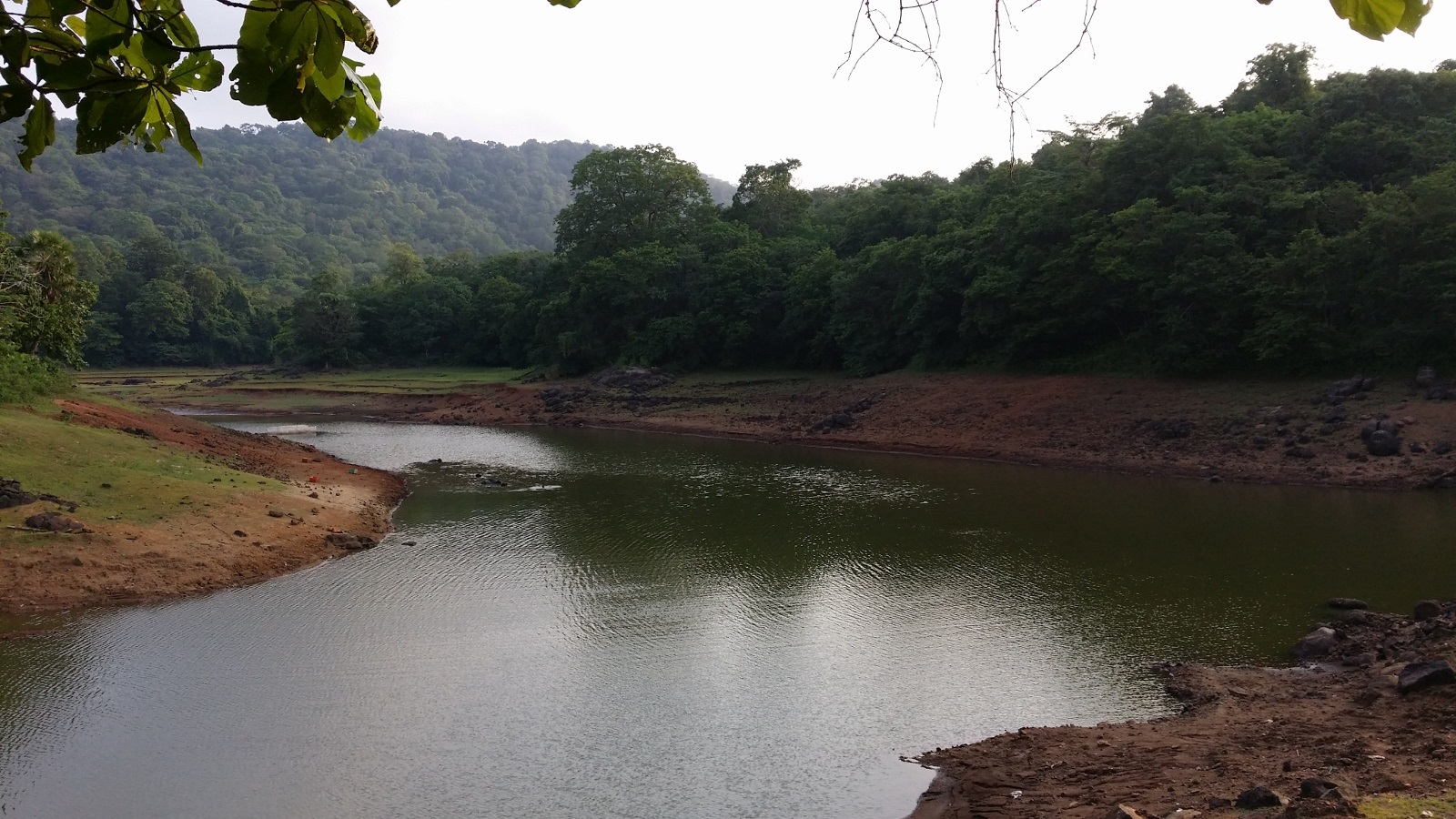
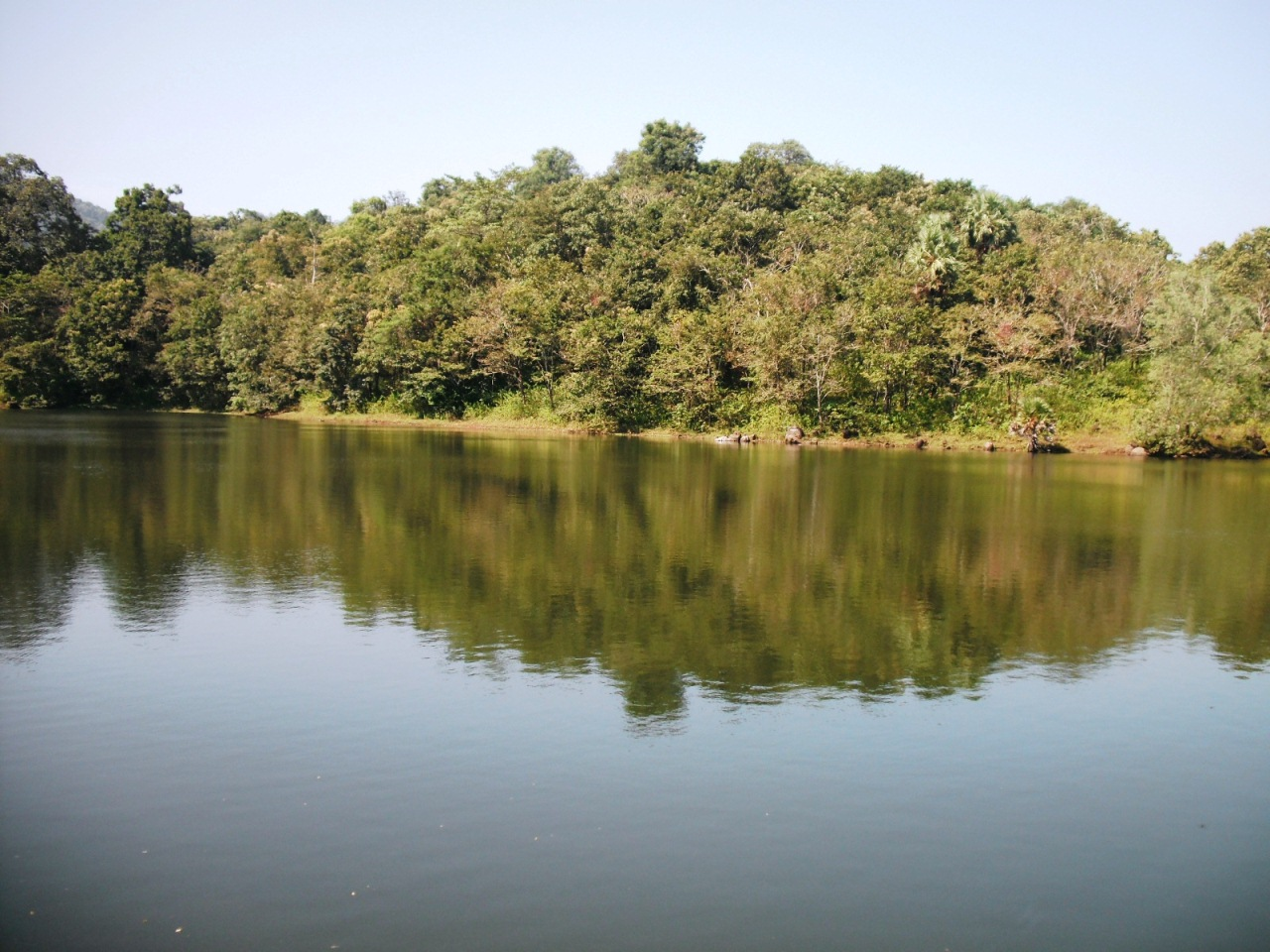
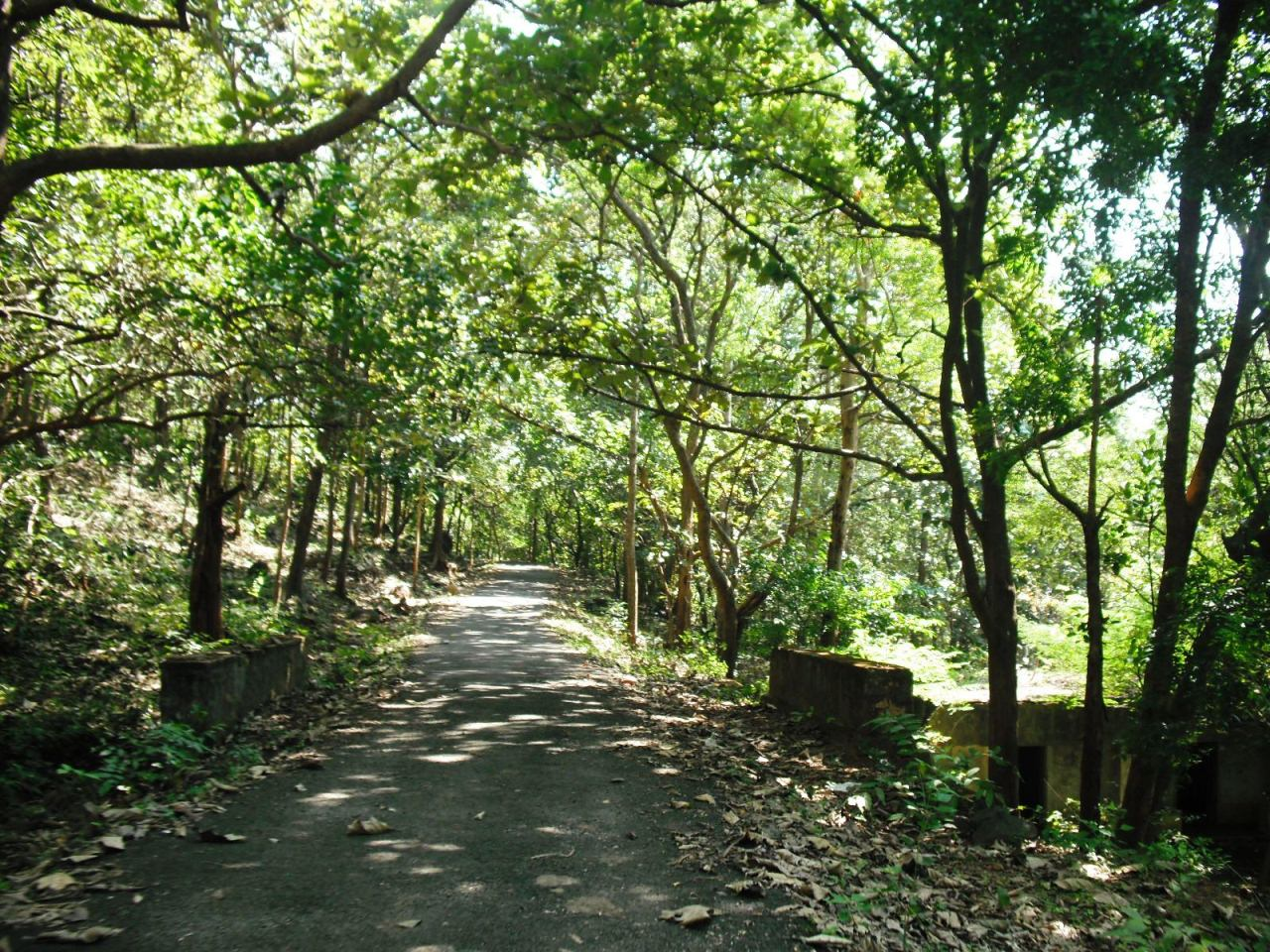
