= Peruvanam Pooram =

Hindu temple festival in Kerala, India

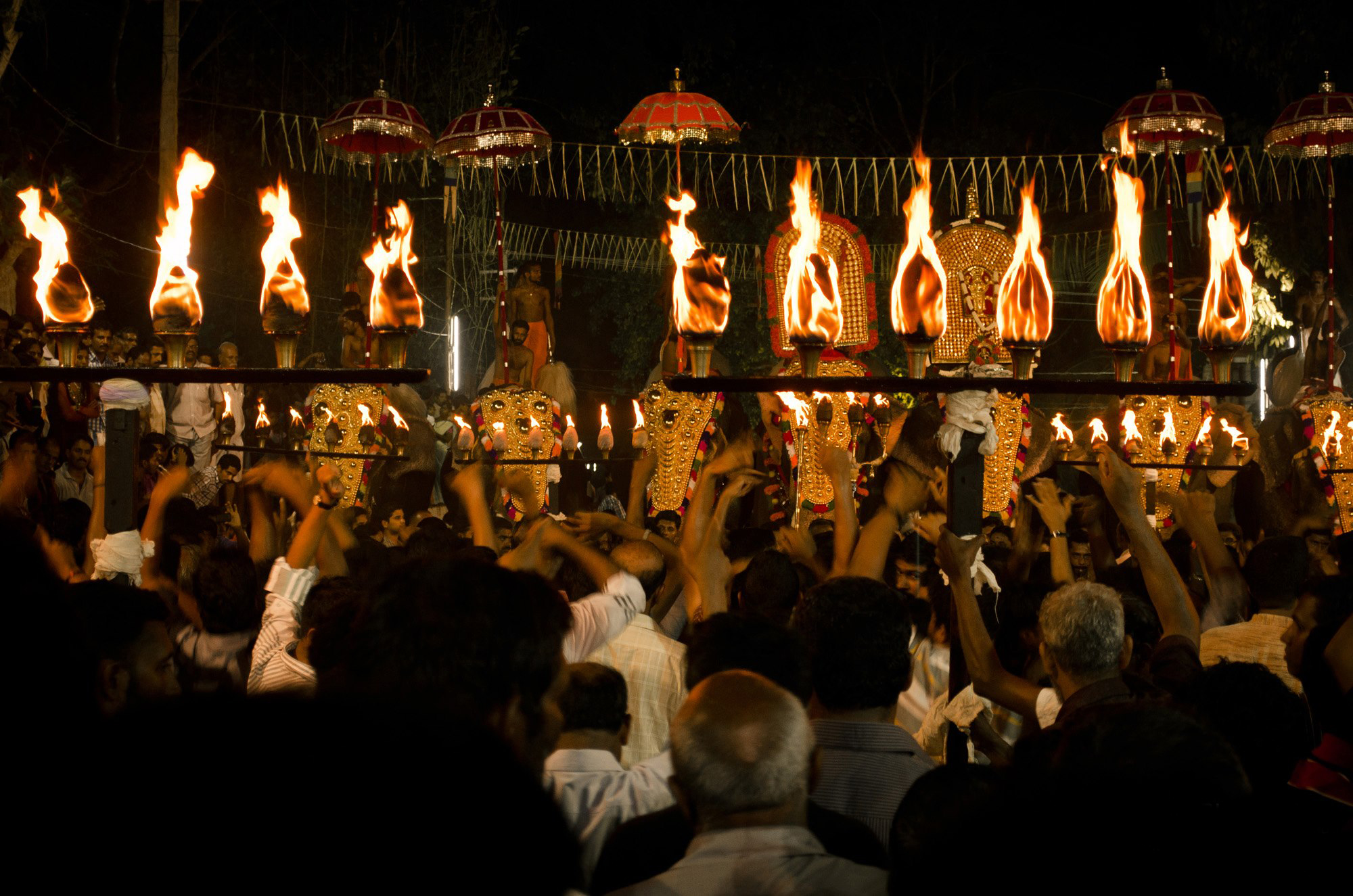
- Peruvanam Pooram in 2013

- Location in Kerala, India
- Coordinates: 10.4327900°N 76.2262200°E
- Country: India
- State: Kerala
- District: Thrissur

Languages
  - Official: Malayalam, English
- Time zone: IST

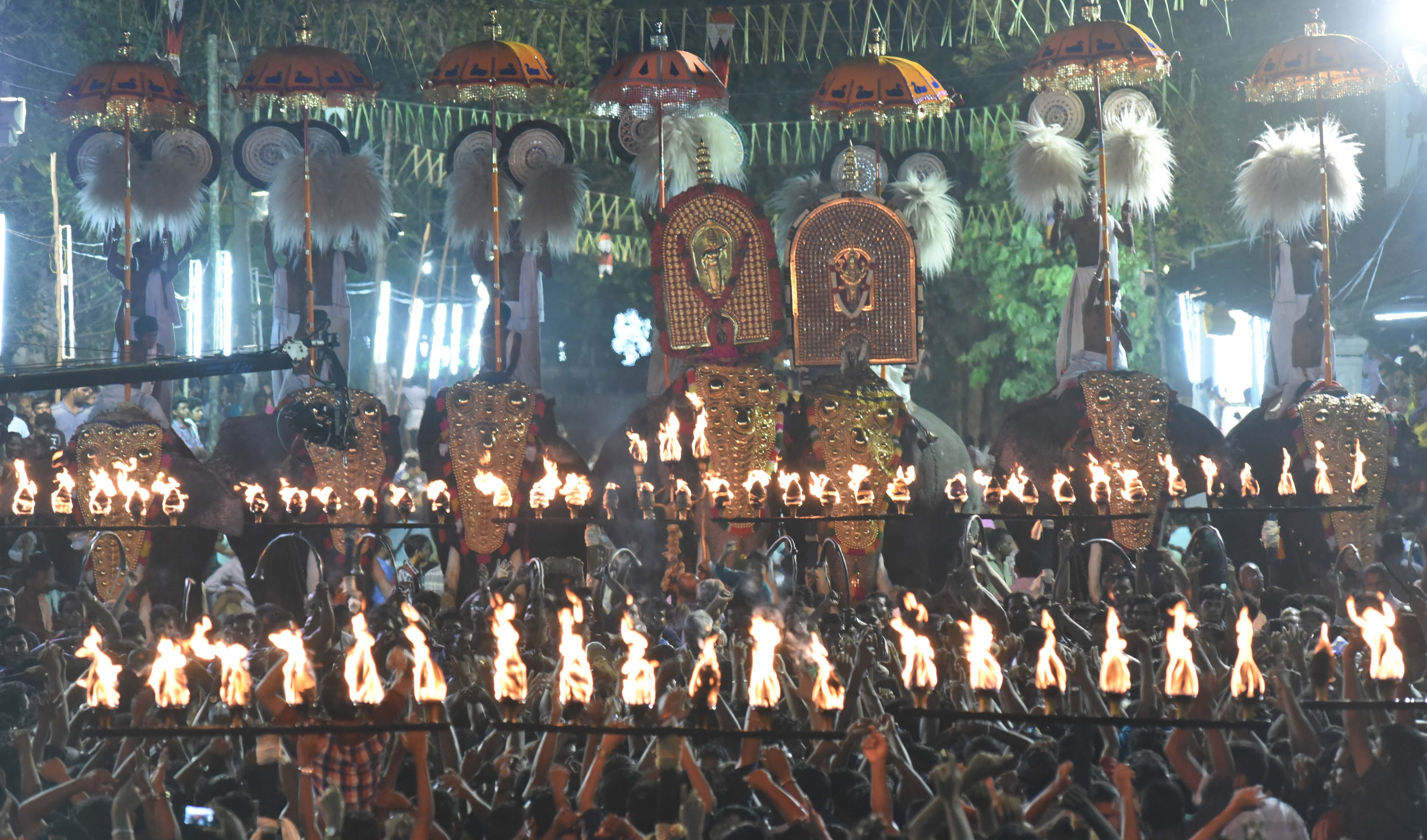
Peruvanam - Chathakudam Sastha's pooram

Peruvanam Pooram is one of the most popular temple festivals of the South Indian state of Kerala. It is held at Peruvanam Temple in Cherpu, Thrissur District. Lord Shiva is the presiding deity of this temple.

The deity of the Peruvanam Mahadeva Temple does not participate in the pooram, and is a silent spectator to the proceedings, just like Thrissur Vadakkumnathan. The participation is limited to temples with Devi and Sastha as the primary deities. It is said that the festival used to witness participation from 108 temples. Presently, the festivities consist of processions (called "Ezhunnallippu") from about 23 temples.

As per records at the Peruvanam Mahadeva Temple (Granthavali), the year 2016 witnessed the 1434th edition of the pooram, in its present form. The pooram occupies an important place in the cultural fabric and history of the state of Kerala.

The Peruvanam pooram is known for its grandeur, and its strict adherence to rituals. The Pandi and Panchari melams played here are of the highest standards. The Panchari melams of Urakam Devi temple and the Cherpu Bhagavathy Temple, are amongst the finest performed, with the latter being the more famous. The Peruvanam Nadavazhi (Malayalam for "Walkway") is the venue for the finest processions/melams, the construction of which is in such a manner that it forms a natural theater for the percussion performances. The Peruvanam Nadavazhi is considered a sacred theatre for Melams by discerning listeners.

Present day festivals in Kerala witness mass participation from all strata of the society. Much of this phenomenon, can be attributed to the Peruvanam Pooram, which has played a major role in developing the cultural fabric of Kerala. The Peruvanam pooram boasts of a rich history, and can perhaps be the oldest organised ritualistic festival existing on the planet.

== History ==
The earliest historical reference to Peruvanam occurs in A.D. 583 ("Ayathu Shivalokam Nah" - kalivakyam denoting the starting of Peruvanam pooram as per Peruvanam Granthavari) which is also the first record of the oldest pooram festival. 108 temples coming under the Peruvanam Kshetra sanketham, which extended from Bharathapuzha in the north to Periyar in the south, used to assemble at Arattupuzha Shastha temple which was the venue of the gala pooram gathering. This was known as Peruvanam pooram or Peruvanam Pallivetta. Due to the detachment of the various temple participants later for various reasons, the pooram festival faltered some five hundred years back. Later, the now famous Thrissur Pooram was started by Sakthan Thampuran of Cochin, in eighteenth century overshadowing the Peruvanam pooram which is now an affair comprising only 23 temples.

The new version has been in existence now for 1431 years. It is held in the Malayalam month of Meenam (usually, April). The pooram consists of numerous Ezhunnallippu (Malayalam word which means taking out a temple deity atop a caparisoned elephant) with elephants totalling seven, to the accompaniment of traditional percussion ensembles like Panchari melam or Pandi melam. For the Peruvanam pooram, the first ezhunnallippu starts in the evening and stretches till dawn of the next day. The pooram has its highlight in the form of the four-hour Panchari melam starting at about 4am.

Although the more popular Thrissur Pooram can be accredited with bringing major changes to the conduct of Poorams in Kerala, the Peruvanam Pooram claims a rich history, and it has witnessed a lot of innovations/additions, some of which form the core of temple festivals in Kerala. The first performance of the Panchari melam is said to have been performed for the Pooram of Urakathamma Thiruvadi, at the Peruvanam Pooram. Caparisons for elephants, called "Nettipattams", were first introduced in the pooram of Cherpu Bhagavathy Temple, at Peruvanam Pooram.

== Proceedings ==
=== Pisharikkal Bhagavathy ===
The Bhagavathy (Malayalam for a feminine deity, generally Devi) from the Pisharikkal temple at Kadalassery sets all the events of the night in motion. The pooram of Pisharikkal Bhagavathy starts at about 4PM, and the procession comprises three elephants, to the accompaniment of Panchari Melam. The word Pisharikkal is a corrupted form of the Malayalam word "Visha-haari" (implying antidote/treatment for poison). This pooram is the ritualistic opener for the events of the day, and all other Poorams have to wait until the procession of Pisharikkal Bhagavathy starts and ends.

=== Arattupuzha Sastha ===
The first main Pooram on the day is of Arattupuzha Sastha. The deity arrives at the temple through the southern entrance (Gopuram) before sunset. Seven elephants decorated with exquisite ornaments stand in a row facing north, but, exposed to the rays of the setting sun. That is a sight that will linger in the mind, for times to come. An elaborate Pandi Melam commences immediately. After about 30 minutes the deity moves towards the eastern entrance (Gopuram) and enters the walkway facing east. The Pandi Melam continues there, and lasts until about 10 PM.

=== Chathakudam Sastha ===
Meanwhile, Chathakudam Sastha would have assembled seven decorated elephants at the eastern end of the walkway and started an elaborate Panchari Melam, just after 7:30 PM. Thottippal Bhagavathy accompanies Sastha on the adjoining elephant to the left. The Melam lasts until about 10:30 All this time, Arattupuzha Sastha would be waiting at the eastern end of the walkway to return to the Peruvanam temple. Two other Sastha, of Metankulam and Kalleli, join Him at that time. The three ascend the walkway with a Panchari Melam. This takes place before the third Pooram of the day, of Urakathu Ammathiruvadi, commences.

=== Urakatthu Ammathiruvadi ===
The Pooram of Ammathiruvadi starts from the same eastern side of the walkway, right behind that of Chathakudam even before that comes to an end. The actual Panchari Melam commences only after that of Chathakudam comes to an end. Then, Chathakudam Sastha joins Ammathiruvadi on an elephant to the right. The Melam goes even beyond midnight. This is followed by fireworks, lit right in front of the deity on the walkway.

=== Vilakku ===
One of the important attractions of Peruvanam Pooram takes place within the temple of Irattayappan at midnight. This is relatively an unnoticed event of the night. Eleven deities who do not have their own elaborate Poorams on the night would have arrived on single elephants while the other Poorams were in progress. They all come to the temple, pay homage to the deity of Irattayappan by going around inside the temple yard and then alight from the elephant. The Kolam would then be led to the Mandapam of Irattayappan where each has specific spot to rest.

At midnight they all mount their own elephants and form an array outside the western entrance to Irattayappan. The respective oil lamps which lead the deities from their temples to Peruvanam also form an array in front of the elephants. The drummers (Maarars) and other supporting percussionists from the respective temples then start an elaborate Panchari Melam. At midnight with no artificial light to spoil the show this event called a ‘Vilakku’ has a mesmerizing effect.

=== Cherpu Bhagavathy ===
Cherpu Bhagavathy is the last to enter the walkway. But, the deity would have arrived by midnight, along the road from the temple which is about a mile away, at the turning to the Thayamkulangara Subrahmaniaswamy temple. There, a Panchavadyam of very high standards commences at about 11:30 PM. The procession of three elephants, accompanied by Panchavadyam slowly moves towards the Mekkavu Kali temple. The Panchavadyam comes to an end there before 3 AM. Subsequently, a Pandi Melam starts, and the procession enters the Peruvanam temple through the western Gopuram. The Melam lasts for an hour. There is a ritual at that time of asking whether there are any other temples which want to perform a Pooram. Cherpu Bhagavathy is supposed to be the last to perform. Hence, the question. Ayykunnu Bhagavathy joins the procession at this time and the two deities on an elephant each, with other five elephants, move towards the eastern side of the temple. That is where the famous Panchari Melam starts, soon after 4 AM. After an hour or so, the procession moves towards the walkway facing east. The Melam lasts until about 8 AM, much after sunrise. The array of seven gold decorated elephants under the rays of the rising sun is another, probably the most thrilling, experience of the Peruvanam Pooram.

=== Conclusion of Poorams ===
All the Bhagavathis, starting with the one from Pisharikkal, conclude the celebration with a ritual bath at the temple pond, called Thotukulam. Each deity performs the bath immediately after the conclusion of its own Pooram.

== See also ==
- Peruvanam
