= Mazhamaṅgalaṃ Nārāyaṇan Naṃpūtiri =

Indian scholar, poet, astrologer, composer and mathematician (c. 1540-1610)

Mazhamaṅgalaṃ Nārāyaṇan Naṃpūtiri (Nārāyaṇa of Mahiṣamaṅgalṃ) (c. 1540–1610) was an Indian scholar, Poet, Astrologer, Composer and Mathematician belonging to the Kerala school of astronomy and mathematics. Nārāyaṇan Naṃpūtiri hailed from Peruvanam village in present-day Thrissur district in Kerala. His father was Mazhamaṅgalaṃ Śaṅkaran Naṃpūtiri himself a respected scholar and writer who had authored a large number of books on astronomy and astrology in the vernacular Malayalam language in an effort to popularize astronomy among the lay public.

There is a legend to the effect that in the early days of his life Nārāyaṇan Naṃpūtiri was a spendthrift and lived a wayward life. One day, at the place of the performance of a yāga, he was hugely insulted for his ignorance of veda-s and other scriptures, and being deeply humiliated he left to Chola country, spent several years there and returned as a great scholar in veda-s, śrauta-śāstra and smārtta-sāstra to the amazement of those who had insulted him earlier. Thereafter, he used to be given a respectful and prominent place at the performance in all such rituals, and even after his death, his spiritual presence used to be invoked on the occasion of the performance of the rituals. His highly respected work Smārta-prāyaścitta-vimarśinī stands testimony to his deep knowledge of veda-s and other scriptures.

His deep knowledge in astronomy and mathematics is reflected in his works. When Śaṅkara Vāriyar, who was composing an erudite and elaborate commentary on Līlāvatī, had to abandon his work due to some inconveniences while he was half-way through the work the task of completing the commentary was entrusted to Mazhamaṅgalaṃ Nārāyaṇan Naṃpūtiri. The commentary known as Kriyākramakarī is of the joint authorship of Śaṅkara Vāriyar and Mazhamaṅgalaṃ Nārāyaṇan Naṃpūtiri. This commentary has become a very valuable source of information regarding the mathematical achievements of the Kerala school of astronomy and mathematics.

Initially Nārāyaṇan Naṃpūtiri was staying at his ancestral home at Peruvanam. Later he moved to Thrissur and took up the position of the chief priest of the local Paramekkavu Bagavathi Temple. While at Thrissur, he married a Brāhmaṇi, a woman of the Nambeesan caste. There was a custom of these Brāhmaṇi-s performing ritualistic singing of devotional songs on the occasions marriage ceremonies. The songs sung during these rituals are called Brāhmaṇi songs. Nārāyaṇan Naṃpūtiri composed as many as five such songs for the benefit of his wife.

== Nārāyaṇan Naṃpūtiri's works ==
=== Work on expiatory rituals ===
Nārāyaṇan Naṃpūtiri's reputation rests mainly on his literary works and on his magnum opus titled Smārta-prāyaścitta-vimarśinī, a work dealing with expiatory rituals. This treatise deals with the expiatory rituals to be carried out in connection with the performance of mega-rituals like Somayajna and is very popular in Kerala.

=== Astronomy and mathematics ===
In one of the verses in Smārta-prāyścitta-vimarśinī, the author has described himself as a gaṇitavid (meaning, "scholar in mathematics"). There are not many works authored by him which can be cited in support of this appellation. An important work that can be cited in this context is a part commentary on Bhāskara II's Līlāvatī. The first half of this commentary called Kriyākramakarī (up to verse 199 in Līlāvatī) has been composed by Śaṅkara Vāriyar, a prominent member of the Kerala school of astronomy and mathematics, and the commentary on the remaining verses was composed by Nārāyaṇan Naṃpūtiri. Two other works on astronomy have been identified as authored by Nārāyaṇan Naṃpūtiri: One of them is a brief commentary called Karmadīpikā or Karmapradīpikā on the textual verses in Līlāvatī and the other is a treatise in five chapters, titled Uparāgakriyākrama, on some new methods for the computation of lunar and solar eclipses.

=== Literary works in Sanskrit ===
- Vyavahāramālā: A work on Indian jurisprudence (Full text is available in the Internet Archive at the link HERE.)
- Mahiṣamaṅgalaṃ Bhāṇaṃ (Full text is available in the Internet Archive at the link HERE. Full text with translation and detailed explanations in Malayalam is available at the link HERE.)
- Uttara Rāmaayaṇa Caṃpu
- Rāsakrīdā Kāvyaṃ

=== Literary works in Malayalam ===
- Naiṣadham (caṃpu)
- Rājarathnāvalīyam (caṃpu)
- Koṭiyaviraham (caṃpu)
- Bānayuddham (caṃpu)
- Rāsakrīḍa (Brāhmaṇi songs)
- Viṣṇumayācaritam (Brāhmaṇi songs)
- Tirunṛittam (Brāhmaṇi songs)
- Dārikavadham (Brāhmaṇi songs)
- Pārvatīstuti (Brāhmaṇi songs)

== Mazhamaṅgalaṃ Nārāyaṇan Naṃpūtiri: the inventor of pañcāri mēḷaṃ ==
Pañcāri mēḷaṃ is a percussion ensemble, performed during temple festivals in Kerala, India. It is one of the major forms of ceṇṭa mēḷaṃ (ethnic drum ensemble), and is the best-known and most popular drum ensemble in the kṣtra-vādyaṃ (temple percussion) genre. Pañcāri mēḷaṃ, comprises the instruments ceṇḍa, ilattāḷaṃ, koṃbu and kuzhal. It was Mazhamaṅgalaṃ Nārāyaṇan Naṃpūtiri, with the support of Pandarathil Raman Marar, who conceptualized, designed and helped to perform first the percussion ensemble known as pañcāri mēḷaṃ. According to traditions, the first performance took place in the precincts of Peruvanam Mahadeva Temple.

== See also ==
- Mazhamaṅgalaṃ Śaṅkaran Naṃpūtiri
- List of astronomers and mathematicians of the Kerala school

== Additional reading ==
- More detailed information about the works of Mazhamaṅgalam Nārāyaṇan Nampūtiri is available in the classic multi-volume Malayalam work "Kerala Sahithya Charithram" ("History of Literature in Kerala") by Ulloor S. Paramesvara Aiyer: Ulloor S. Paramesvara Aiyer (September 1954). Kerala Sahithya Charithram Part II. Thiruvananthapuram, Kerala, India: Department of Publications, University of Travancore. (pages 293–301)
- For a detailed description of the structure of pañcāri mēḷaṃ see: Vishnu Achutha Menon and Boobalakrishnan. N (2020). "The Rhythmic Structure of Melam". The Chitralekha Journal on Art and Design. 4 (2): 1–14..
