= Mithranandapuram Vamanamoorthy Temple =

- Mithranandapuram Vamanamoorthy Temple, Cherpu, Thrissur, Kerala

Religion
- Affiliation: Hinduism
- District: Thrissur
- Deity: Vishnu
- Festival: Sampoorna Yajurveda Yajna

Location
- Location: Cherpu
- State: Kerala
- Country: India
- Interactive map of Mithranandapuram Vamanamoorthy Temple
- Coordinates: 10.446478°N 76.205465°E

Architecture
- Type: Architecture of Kerala

Specifications
- Temple: One
- Elevation: 28.16 m (92 ft)

Mithranandapuram Vamanamoorthy Temple is a Hindu temple situated in Cherpu of Thrissur District of Kerala, India. According to the legends, the idol worshiped here is more than 1,500 years old.

== Story ==
Mahabali, the king of the Daityas or Asuras, i.e., demons in the Treta Yuga, reached the zenith of power and fame. He owed his tremendous success and prosperity in life to his observance of an austere and virtuous lifestyle. He performed many ritual sacrifices or Yajna to consolidate his sway over the three worlds of the universe (Heaven, Earth and Underworld). Lord Vamana has blessed king Sri Mahabali on his request for three feet of mud; the mood of the deity in the temple is that of blessing the king Mahabali. Vishnu was immensely pleased with the goodness of Mahabali. He educated Bali about the demerits of pride and arrogance, which forbids man from optimum progress. He allowed Mahabali to take shelter in the Paradise of the sacred abode, where lived the pure Prahlada. MahaVishnu further blessed Mahabali, that he would be the ruler of the earth in the following age or Yuga. Those who sacrifice themselves in the lotus feet of the deity get his blessings.

== Ownership ==
The temple is owned by three uranmakkar: Alakkattu Mana, Pattachomarayath Mana and Akkarachittur Mana. The present administration of the temple is done by Sri. Krishnan Namboodiri, Kizhillath Mana, Perumbillissery on the strength of the authority given by the uranmakkar. The chief priest or Thanthri of the Temple is Nedumpilly Tharananellur Mana, Irinjalakuda. Lord Ganesha, Swamiyar (guru) and Lord Annapoorneswari are the other deities.

== Visiting ==
One can get down at Perumbillissery Centre from the bus and walk less than 0.5 km west to reach the temple. Anybody in the centre can guide, as the temple is known to all. The temple is open from 5.30 AM to 10.30AM and 5.30 PM to 7.30 PM all days. This is subject to change on special days like Thiruvonam, Prathishta Dinam, Othukottu, lunar and solar eclipse days.

== Othu Kottu festival ==
The main festival of the temple is Sampoorna Yajurveda Yajna or Othu Kottu. Yajurveda Samhitha recital is one of the special prayers offered in the temple. Othu means Veda and Kottu means recitals. The whole text of Yajurveda is recited once in every three years by Yajurveda scholars from parts of Kerala. The Yajna is conducted by 10 Namboodiri families of the locality with co-operation of devotees.
