= Cherpu =

- town
- Interactive map of Cherpu
- Coordinates: 10.431290°N 76.199020°E
- Country: India
- State: Kerala
- District: Thrissur

Government
  - Body: Cherpu Grama Panchayath

Languages
  - Official: Malayalam
- Time zone: UTC+5:30 (IST)
- PIN: 680561
- Area code: 0487
- Vehicle registration: KL 45
- Temperature Range: 22.5°C -35 °C

Bastian Vinaya Sankar

Wooden elephant

Cherpu is a suburb of Thrissur city in the Kerala State of South India. It is 12 kilometres south of Thrissur town and is on the Thriprayar road. It is dotted by a number of temples and has quite a few rivers flowing by its vicinity.

The village occupies a prominent place in the Kerala's cultural map as Cherpu is one of the main venues of the state's classical percussion ensembles like chenda melam and panchavadyam, staged as they are during temple festivals called pooram. Naturally, Cherpu is the birthplace of many leading (as well as lesser known) practitioners of ethnic Kerala instruments like chenda, ilathalam, kombu, kuzhal, timila, maddalam and edakka.

Cherpu has two major poorams—Peruvanam Pooram and Arattupuzha Pooram. Peruvanam, otherwise traditionally known as one of the leading Namboodiri villages of Kerala, has today many of its people employed in the manufacture of furniture and gold ornaments. Legend has it that Peruvanam village was one of the settlements created by sage Parashuram, the mythical creator of Kerala.

Cherpu was a central place for Mahatma Gandhi's village renaissance. It was known as "Vardha" at the time of the Kochi kingdom.

As for its temples, Cherpu has the grand-structured Peruvanam temple besides the ones called Arattupuzha, Urakam and Thiruvullakkavu. Thiruvullakkavu temple is famous for initiating children to the world of letters on Vidyarambham, an auspicious day in Hindu tradition.

For long, Cherpu had paddy fields that spread as far as Triprayar. The west and east sides of Cherpu were marked by rocks. Cherpu is located in between this rock- and water-covered area. Hence the name Cherpu, which means cherunnidam (joining place) in Malayalam.

== Politics ==
Cherpu assembly constituency was part of Trichur (Lok Sabha constituency). But after reconstitution of assembly constituencies, it is now a part of Nattika assembly constituency and the present MLA is Geetha Gopi.

== Religious Centres ==
- Mithranandapuram Sree Vamanamoorthy Temple
- Peruvanam Mahadeva Temple
- Ammathiruvadi Temple
- Cherpu Bhagavathy Temple
- Thiruvullakkavu Sree Dharma Sastha Temple
- Thayamkulangara Sree Subrahmanya Swamy Temple
- Kandeswaram Mahadeva Temple
- St. Antony's Church, Cherpu
- Little Flower Church, Poochinnipadam
- St. Rock's Church, Pootharakal
- Cherpu Cheruchenam Juma Masjid (Est. 1863)
- Urakam Juma Masjid
- Muthulliyal Mahlara Masjid
- vadakumuri masjid cherpu

== Educational organizations ==
- Gurukulam public school, Venginnissery
- St. Thomas H.S, Vallachira
- Govt vocational higher secondary school Cherpu
- CNN Boys higher secondary school
- CNN Girls higher secondary school
- Lourde matha english medium higher secondary school
- Santa Maria Academy
- St. Xaviers H.S, Chevvor
- Junior Basic School (J B School), Cherpu West
- St. Rock's LP School, Pootharakal
- Global Public School, Muthulliyal (CBSE)

== Temple Festivals ==
Siva Temple at Cherpu
- Location in Kerala, India
- 10.4312900°N 76.1990200°E
- Location: Cherpu, Kerala, India

=== Peruvanam Pooram ===
Peruvanam temple in Cherpu is praised in the Manipravalam work Chandrostavam. Six Vattezhuthu and Malayalam inscriptions have been found in the temple. An 11th-century inscription from Thiruvattoor in north Kerala refers to seven persons originally belonging to this village, along with others being established there and a new settlement created. The main prathishta on this temple is Lord Siva. People believe that Peruvanam was once a big forest. The word vanam means forest in Malayalam. Peruvanam means a thick forest. This temple has artworks on the roof. It has a rare double-storeyed sreekovil (sanctum sanctorum), each presided by a deity of Lord Shiva. It is believed that Lord siva did tapas (penance) on a certain tree and that changed into the present sreekovil.

Peruvanam Pooram began a long time ago. Legend has it that it started in the form of an Utsavam (a bit different in rituals from Pooram and extending to 28 days) which went on for 500 years. After that, it was stopped for a period of time. Later it was restarted in the form of two poorams Peruvanam and Arattupuzha. The new version has been in existence now for 1425 years. It is held in the Malayalam month of Meenam (usually, April). There will be an Ezhunnallippu (Malayalam word which means taking out a temple deity atop a caparisoned elephant along with many jumbos—here totalling seven—to the accompaniment of traditional percussion ensembles like Panchari melam or Pandi melam. For the Peruvanam pooram, the first ezhunnallippu starts in the evening. More such processions follow, and the festival ends in the morning. The pooram has its highlight in the form of the four-hour Panchari melam starting past midnight and followed by fireworks.

=== Arattupuzha Pooram ===
The famous Sastha temple at Aarattupuzha is 14 km south of Thrissur town, and celebrates its annual pooram festival in April/May. Arattupuzha pooram is known as Deva mela, a conglomeration of gods, given its massive attendance of deities from neighbourhood shrines. Historical records suggest that Arattupuzha pooram has been celebrated for more than 1,430 years. Like in Peruvanam, Arattupuzha pooram to features a series of ezhunnallipus. The highlight, however, is the kootti ezhunnallippu, where canonically 101 elephants would line up in the wee hours to the accompaniment of Pandi melams. The deity of Sriramaswamy, called Thriprayar Thevar, would occupy the centre slot, atop a decorated tusker on the main dyke (locally called nadavarambu) of the sprawling paddy fields.

Arattupuzha Pooram is the oldest and arguably the most spectacular of the pooram festivals of Kerala. It is believed that on this day 101 gods and goddesses of the neighbouring villages visited Sastha (Ayyappa), the presiding deity of the Arattupuzha temple. Nowadays around 70 elephants take part in the pooram procession on the sixth day of the seven-day festival. Pachari melam, Pandi melam, Panchavadyam add to the festive tempo. The arattu (holy bath of the idol of the deity) ritual is performed with great pomp and gaiety in the Arattupuzha river on the following day.

The final pooram is conducted—these days with 61 caparisoned elephants—bearing bright coloured parasols, presenting an amazing spectacle. The temple ensembles lend the event a touch of majesty. The elephant carries the images of the deities of 41 neighbouring temples to this village. Arattupuzha temple is open 05:00 - 09:30 am & 05:00 - 07:00 pm. The festival concludes with the arattu (holy bath of the idol of the deity).

=== Thayamkulangara Pooyam ===
Thayamkulangara Sree Subrahmanya Swamy Temple is another temple in Cherpu. It is known as Kerala Palani. The main festival in this temple is pooyam. This is celebrated in January–February every year. People celebrate pooyam with kavadiyattam.

=== Chathakudam Pooram ===
Chathakudam Pooram is known as the first Pooram in Peruvanam-Arattupuzha Pooram Festivals. This pooram is historically known as "Thiruvathira Purappadu" of Chathakudam Sree Dharma Sastha on Meenam Month. Chathakudam Sastha will participate in Peruvanam Pooram, Arattupuzha Pooram, Thottippal, Thikkattussery pooram etc. as a main participant. Sastha will be the main honour for Arattupuzha Peruvanam Pooram and Arattupuzha Devamela with Thriprayar Thevar.

== Wooden elephant making ==
Cherpu, a village in Thrissur, Kerala, is famous for its tradition of making wooden handicrafts. A person can identify elephants made from Cherpu easily by looking at the nail. The nail will be painted in white color neatly. An interesting aspect of this is that the elephants are made with a single piece of wood. There are a number of craftsmen specializing in this art form.
