= Peruvanam Mahadeva Temple =

Peruvanam Mahadev Temple
- പെരുവനം മഹാദേവക്ഷേത്രം
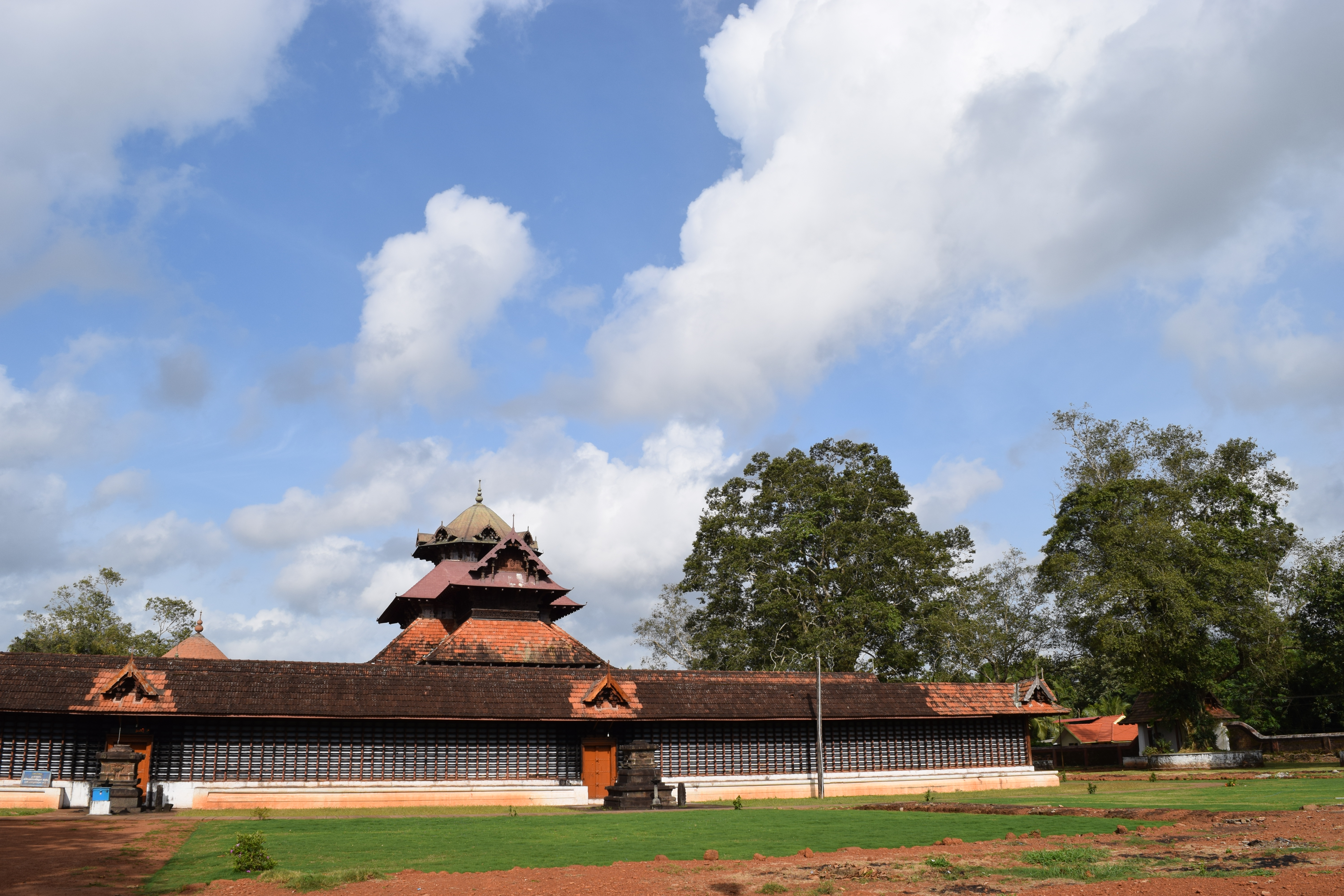
- Shiva temple at Peruvanam

Religion
- Affiliation: Hinduism
- District: Thrissur
- Deity: Shiva
- Festival: Maha Shivaratri

Location
- Location: Peruvanam, Thrissur District
- State: Kerala
- Country: India
- Interactive map of Peruvanam Mahadev Temple
- Coordinates: 10.4373°N 76.2120°E

Architecture
- Type: (Kerala style)
- Creator: Parasurama
- Completed: 12th century

Specifications
- Temple: One
- Elevation: 41.37 m (136 ft)

Peruvanam Mahadev Temple (Malayalam: പെരുവനം മഹാദേവക്ഷേത്രം) is a Shiva Temple situated in Peruvanam of Thrissur District, Kerala, India. The temple is said to be in existence with the origin of Kerala and the advent of Parashurama. It is one among the famous 108 Shiva temples in Kerala, and is the main temple of the old time Peruvanam village. It is surrounded by Bhadrakali and Subramanya temples on the west, a Sastha temple on the north, a Vishnu temple on the east and a Durga temple on the south.

== Temple ==
The temple stands on a 7-acre ground surrounded by a compound wall. The structure of Shrikovil (main shrine) is square-type.

It is said that a sage named puru did penance here, as the region was a forest (vanam) it got the named 'peruvanam'.

There main deity is Shiva, also known as erattayappan as there are two shivaling in the peetham (one larger than the other). Goddess Parvati is worshipped behind erattayappan in the same Sanctum sanctorum. There is a 120 feet tall sreekovil dedicated to Madathilappan.

The temple is site for the famous and ancient Peruvanam Pooram where 19 deities from other temples come to pay tributes to erattayappan.

== Gallery ==
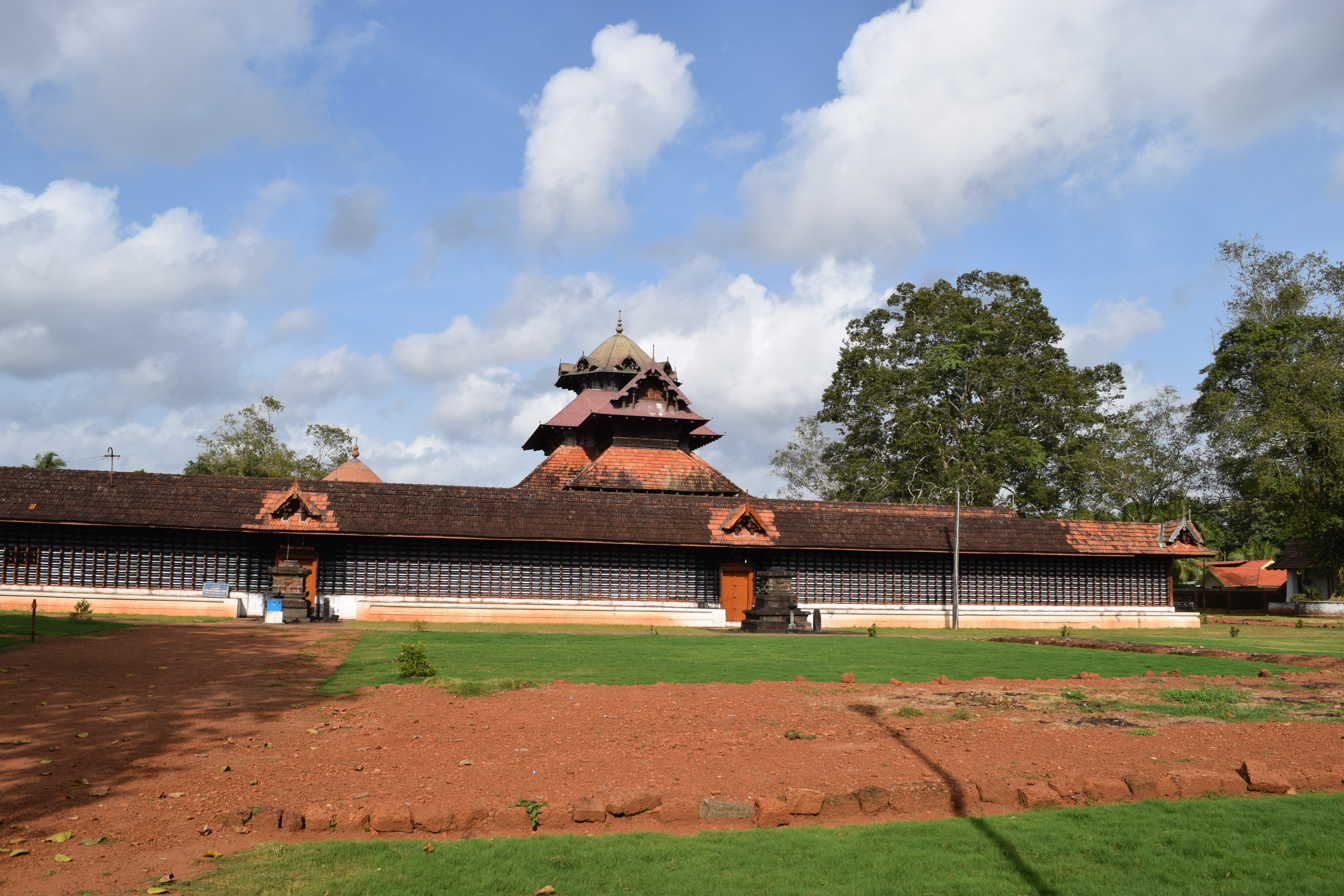
Side view

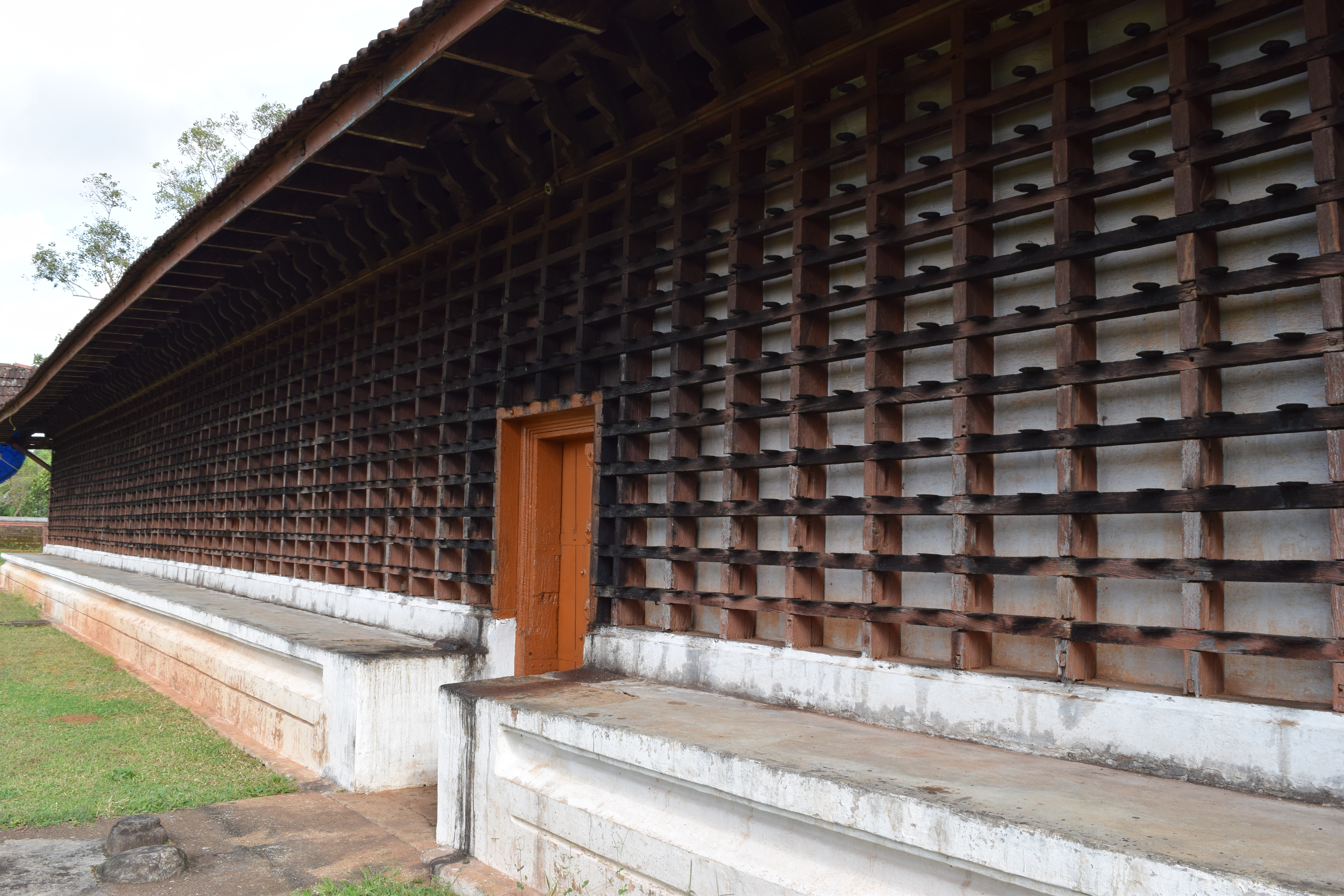
Lamps on the wall

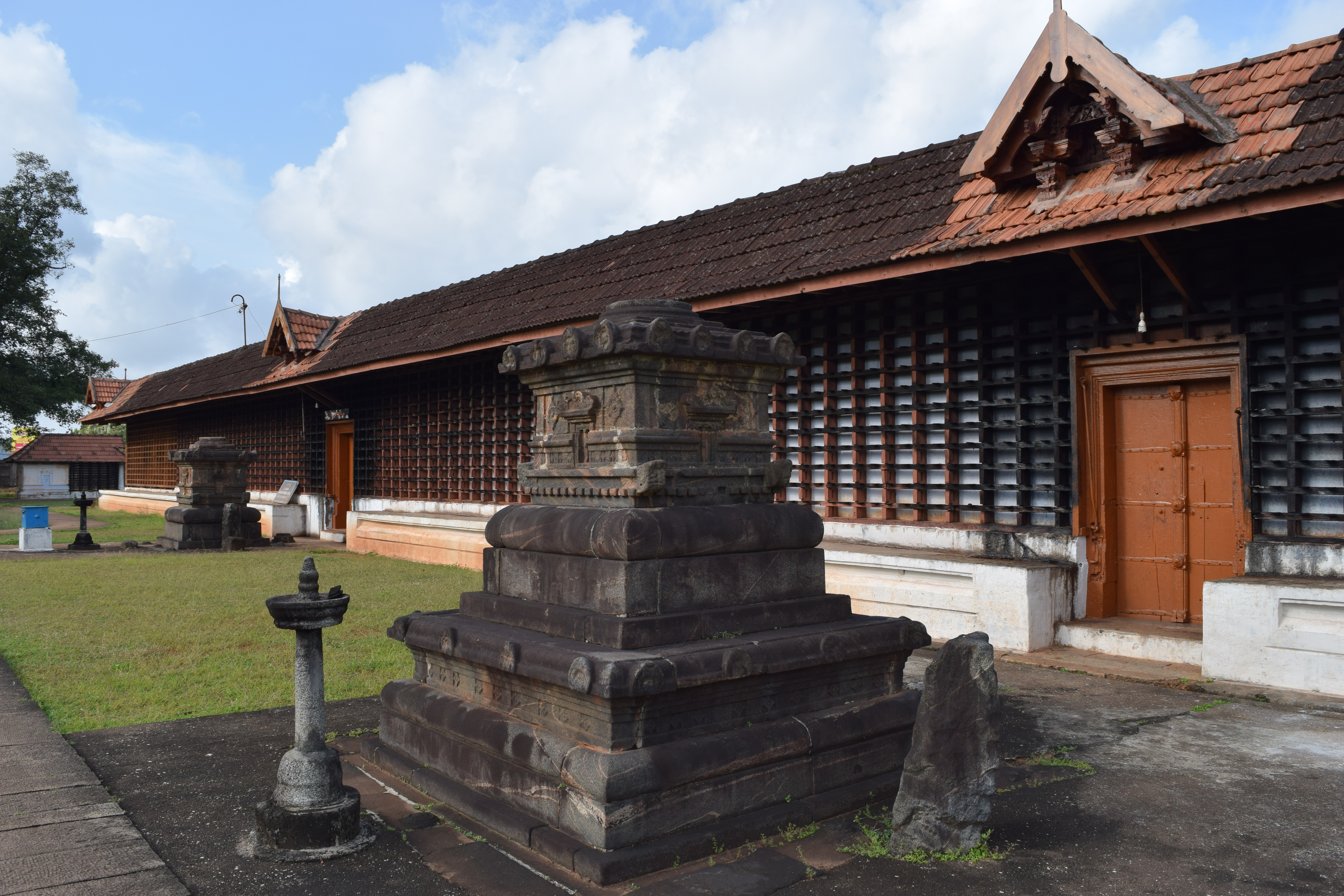
Balikk

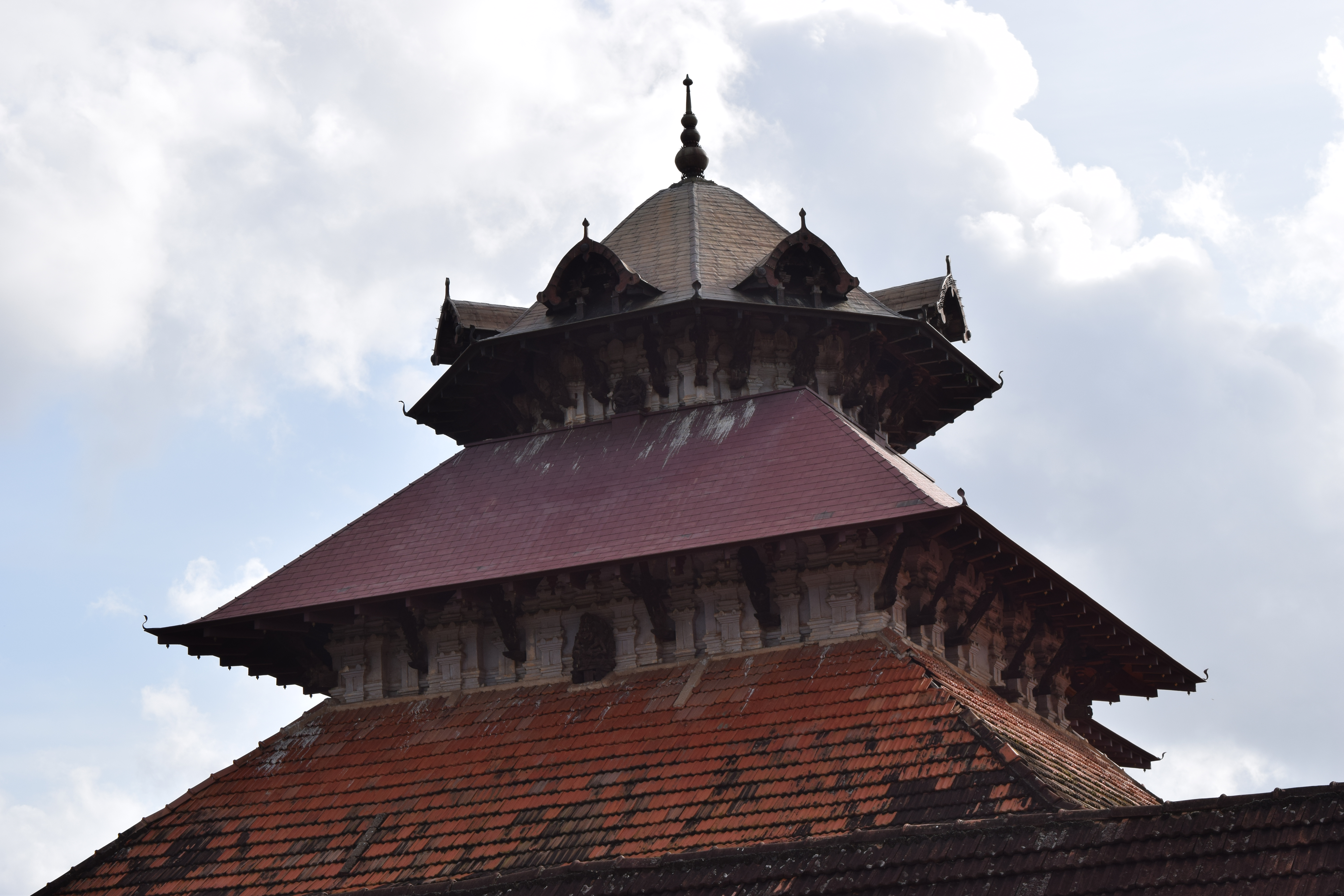
Top of the temple

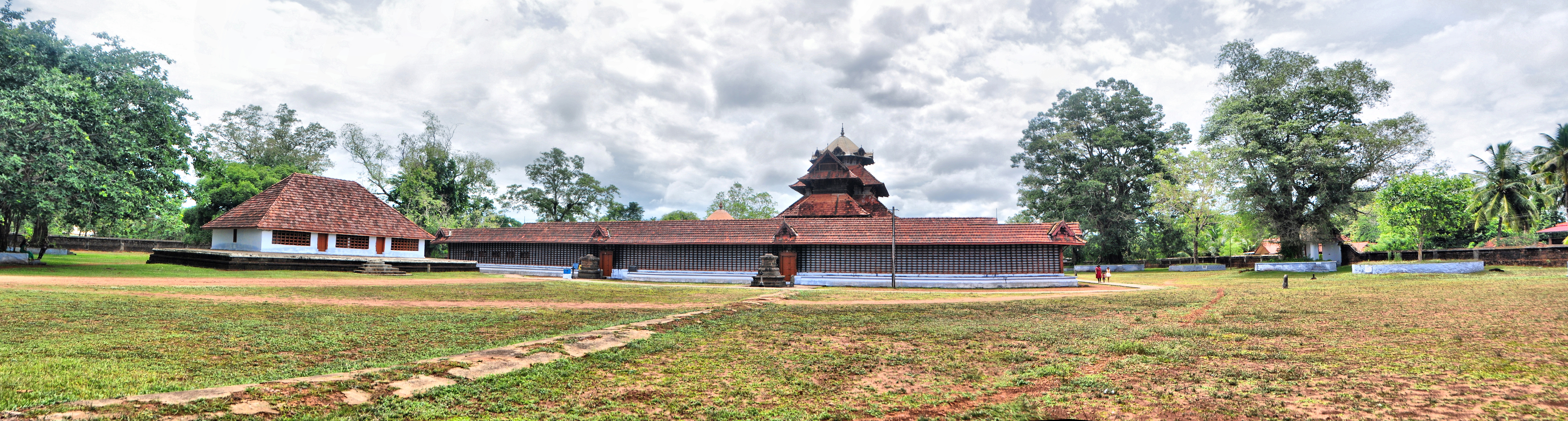
Panoramic view of the temple

== See also ==
- Hindu temples in Thrissur Rural
- Peruvanam
