= Mazhamaṅgalaṃ Śaṅkaran Naṃpūtiri =

Indian astronomer, astrologer & mathematician

Mazhamaṅgalaṃ Śaṅkaran Naṃpūtiri (Śaṅkara of Mahiṣamaṅgalṃ) (1494–1570) was an Indian astronomer-astrologer-mathematician belonging to the Kerala school of astronomy and mathematics who wrote a large number of books on astronomy and astrology in the vernacular language Malayalam in an effort to popularize these subjects among the common Malayalam speaking laypersons. He hailed from Peruvanam village in present-day Thrissur district. He spent most of his active life at Chengannur with his teacher Parameśvaran Pōtti of Vāzha-māveli house.

Śaṅkaran Nampūtiri's son Mazhamaṅgalam Nārāyaṇan Nampūtiri was also a great scholar and had produced several original literary works in Malayalam, Sanskrit and mixed Malayalam-Sanskrit (called Maṇipravāḷaṃ) languages.

== Śaṅkaran Nampūtiri's works ==
Śaṅkaran Nampūtiri's is known to have composed the following works.

1. Gaṇitasāra (astronomy)
2. Candragaṇitakrama (astronomy)
3. Ayanacalanādigaṇitakrama (astronomy)
4. Jāatakakrama (horoscopy)
5. Praśnamāla with Bhāṣā (astrological query)
6. Ceriya Kāaladīpakaṃ (short Kāaladīpakaṃ)
7. Valiya Kāaladīpakaṃ (long Kāaladīpakaṃ)
8. Jātakasāra in Sanskrit (astrology)
9. Jātakasāra in Malayalam (astrology)
10. Commentaries on Pañjabodha, Laghubhāskarīya, Muhūrtapadavī (all called Bālasaṅkaraṃ)
11. Pañjabodhārthadarpaṇa

== See also ==
- List of astronomers and mathematicians of the Kerala school
- Pañcabodha

== Additional reading ==
More detailed information about the works of Mazhamaṅgalam Śaṅkaran Nampūtiri is available in the classic multi-volume Malayalam work "Kerala Sahithya Charithram" ("History of Literature in Kerala") by Ulloor S. Paramesvara Aiyer: Ulloor S. Paramesvara Aiyer (September 1954). Kerala Sahithya Charithram Part II. Thiruvananthapuram, Kerala, India: Department of Publications, University of Travancore. (pages 269-272 and 469–475)
