= Vyavahāramālā =

Vyavahāramālā is a treatise in Sanskrit on jurisprudence and legal practices composed by an unknown scholar from Kerala sometime during the 16th-17th centuries CE. This was the standard reference for legal practices in the kingly courts of the erstwhile kingdoms of Travancore and Cochin till the adoption of modern legal practices under the supervision and guidance of John Munro (1778 – 1858) who had served as Resident and Diwan of the States of Travancore and Cochin between 1810 and 1819. However, Munro's reforms did not make Vyavahāramālā completely obsolete. Munro used it to develop an Anglo-Indian code of law for the Travancore kingdom called Caṭṭavariyōla and established a hierarchy of courts and the rules for presenting cases in those courts.

Vyavahāramālā is a digest of rules on legal procedure extracted from the well-known ancient Smṛti called Parāśarasmṛiti. Based on the selection and organization of the verses collected in the Vyavahāramālā one could see that is a it is a collection of verses on law and legal procedure based on the Vyavahāranirṇaya of Varadaraja. It is a work consisting of 1234 verses and the main part is divided into 19 chapters called prakaraṇa-s. Before starting the prakaraṇa-s, the author has dealt with some general requirements of legal procedures like qualities of the judge, the layout of the court, etc. The first eleven prakaraṇa-s deal with civil laws, the next five prakaraṇa-s deal with criminal laws, the seventeenth prakaraṇa discusses laws relating to partition of property, the eighteenth one deals with some further aspects of criminal laws and the final prakaraṇa is devoted miscellaneous topics not touched upon in the previous chapters.

== Authorship ==
Ulloor S. Paramesvara Aiyer in his multi-volume "Kerala Sahithya Charithram" ("History of Literature in Kerala") claimed that Mazhamaṅgalaṃ Nārāyaṇan Naṃpūtiri (c. 1540–1610) who hailed from Kerala, India was the author of Vyavahāramāla. But curiously, in a Malyalam translation of Vyavahāramāla authored by Ulloor S. Paramesvara Aiyer himself, there is no mention of the authorship of Vyavahāramāla. It appears that the authorship of Vyavahāramāla has not been determined definitively.

== Contents ==
The following list of topics discussed in Vyavahāramāla indicates the nature of the contents in the work.

1. Origin, definition and classifications of vyavahāra
2. Dharma of chief justice
3. The construction of court
4. Non-suit
5. Punishments: the king's authority
6. The methods of court procedure
7. Compromise of vādi-pradivādi
8. Trail the dispute according to pramāṇas
9. The evidence as a witness
10. Documents of victory-judgment(jayapatra)
11. Truth ordeal
12. Payment and recovery of debts
13. The definition of interest
14. Pledge-mortgages
15. Surety-ship
16. Payment and recovery of debts
17. Sale-without ownership
18. Partnership
19. Resumption of gift
20. Law of master (Breach of contract of service)
21. Non-payment of wages
22. Swamipāla vivāda prakaraṇa
23. Custom according to the caste and tribes
24. Non-delivery after sale
25. Goods buying and selling
26. Boundary disputes
27. Defamation: classification of crimes
28. Assault
29. Theft
30. Crimes of violence
31. Adultery and rape
32. Partition
33. Gambling and betting
34. Miscellaneous matters

== Full texts ==
- The full text of Vyavahāramālā in Malayalam script with a translation in Malayalam by Ulloor S. Paramesvara Aiyar is available in Wikimedia at the link HERE.
- The full text of Vyavahāramālā in Devanagari script with an English translation is available as part of a Ph D thesis submitted to Kerala University in December 2002: Asoka kumar V (2002). Vyavaharamala: Translation and study (PDF). Kerala University.
- Full text of Vyavahāramālā in Devanagari script is available in the Internet Archive at the link HERE.
- For a detailed account of the work, see the PhD thesis on Vyavahaaramālā submitted to Sree Sankaracharya University of Sanskrit in 2008: Rajee P V (2008). Vyavaharamala: A text on Indian jurisprudence. Sree Sankaracharya University of Sanskri.
- A digitized scanned copy of a palm-leaf manuscript of a detailed commentary in Malayalam of Vyavahāramālā composed probably sometime before 1809 has been preserved in the Gundert Collection in the University of Tübingen. The same is available for view at the link HERE and for download at the link HERE (270 MB).
