= Vazhani Dam =

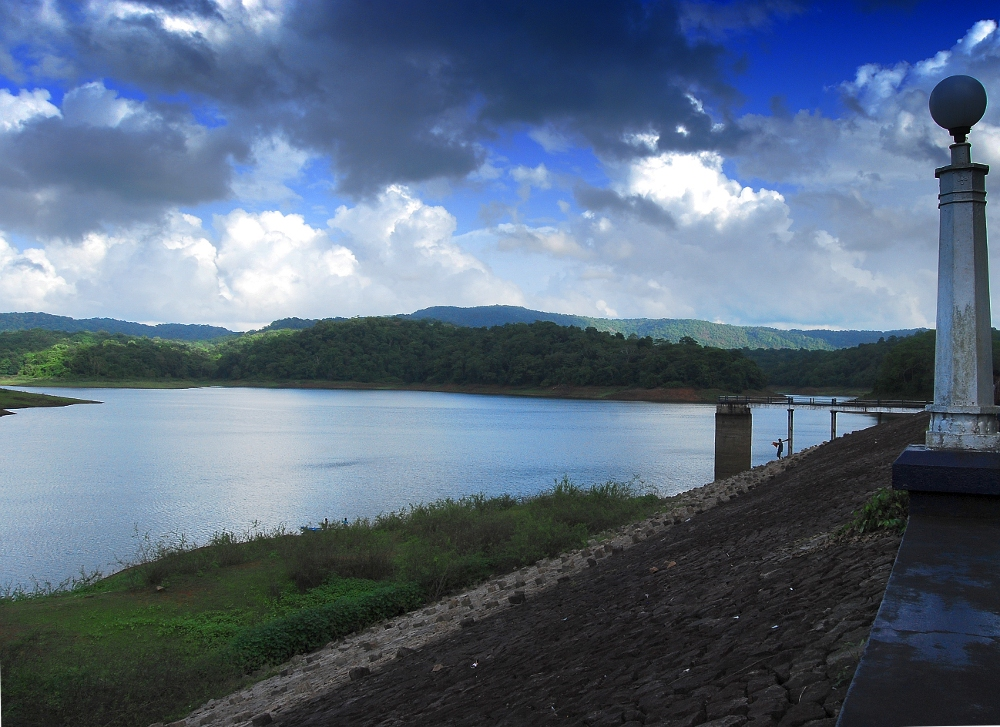
- A view of dam and reservoir

- Location within India Location within Kerala
- Official name: Vazhani Dam
- Country: india
- Location: Vazhani, Thrissur, Kerala, India
- Coordinates: 10.637°N 76.307°E
- Purpose: Irrigation
- Opening date: 1962
- Owner: Government of Kerala
- Operators: Irrigation Department, Kerala

Dam and spillways
- Type of dam: Earth Dam
- Length: 792.48 m (2,600.0 ft)

Reservoir
- Creates: Wadakkanchery River
- Website www.vazhanidam.gov.in

Vazhani Dam is a clay dam built across the Kechery River (also known as Wadakkancherry river) near Wadakkancherry in Thrissur district of Kerala. The water is used for irrigation and drinking purposes. The dam has a four-acre garden and the construction was completed in 1962. Vazhani dam is built with mud and it is an earth dam like Banasura Sagar Dam.

== Gallery ==
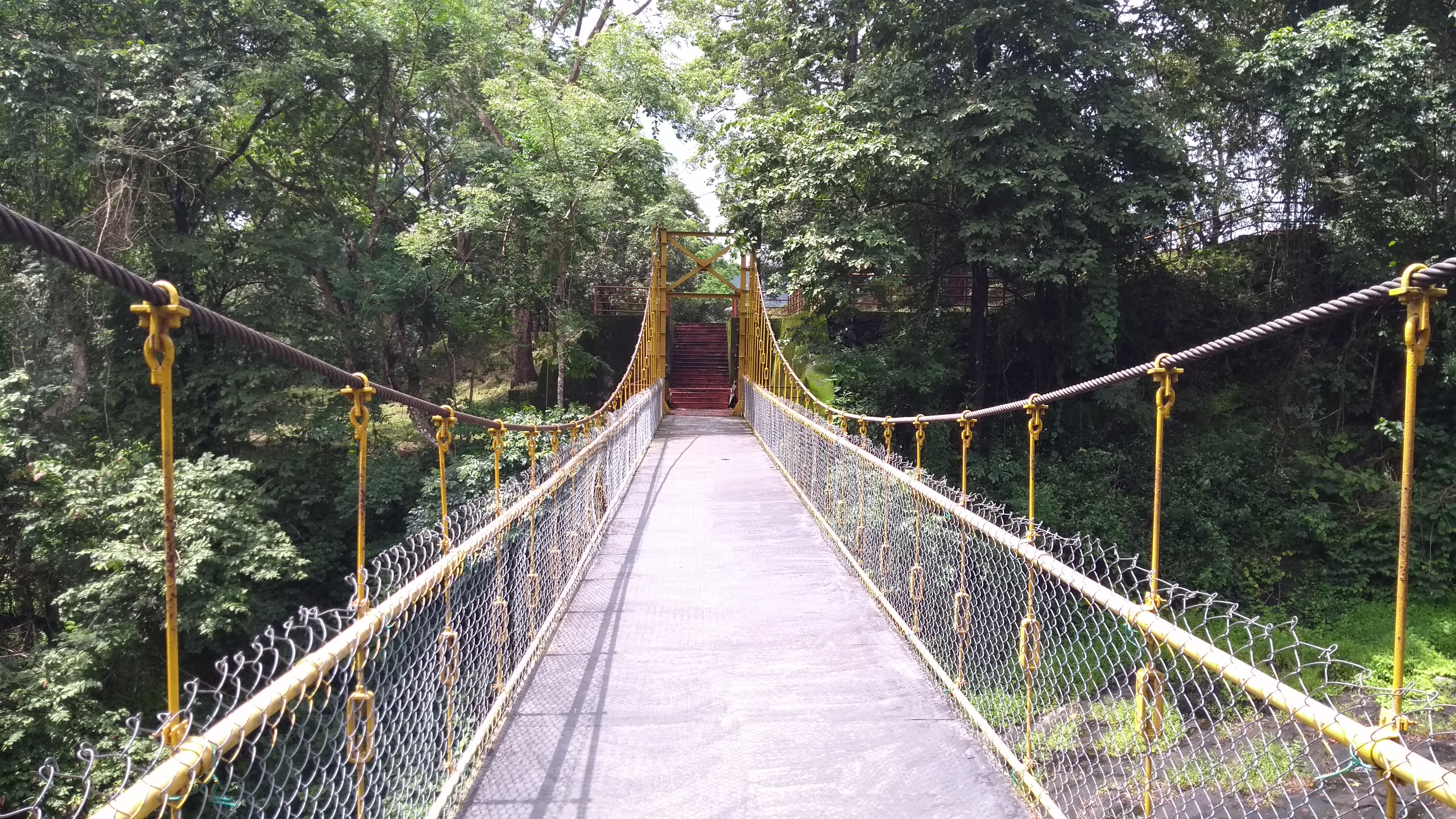
Hanging Bridge

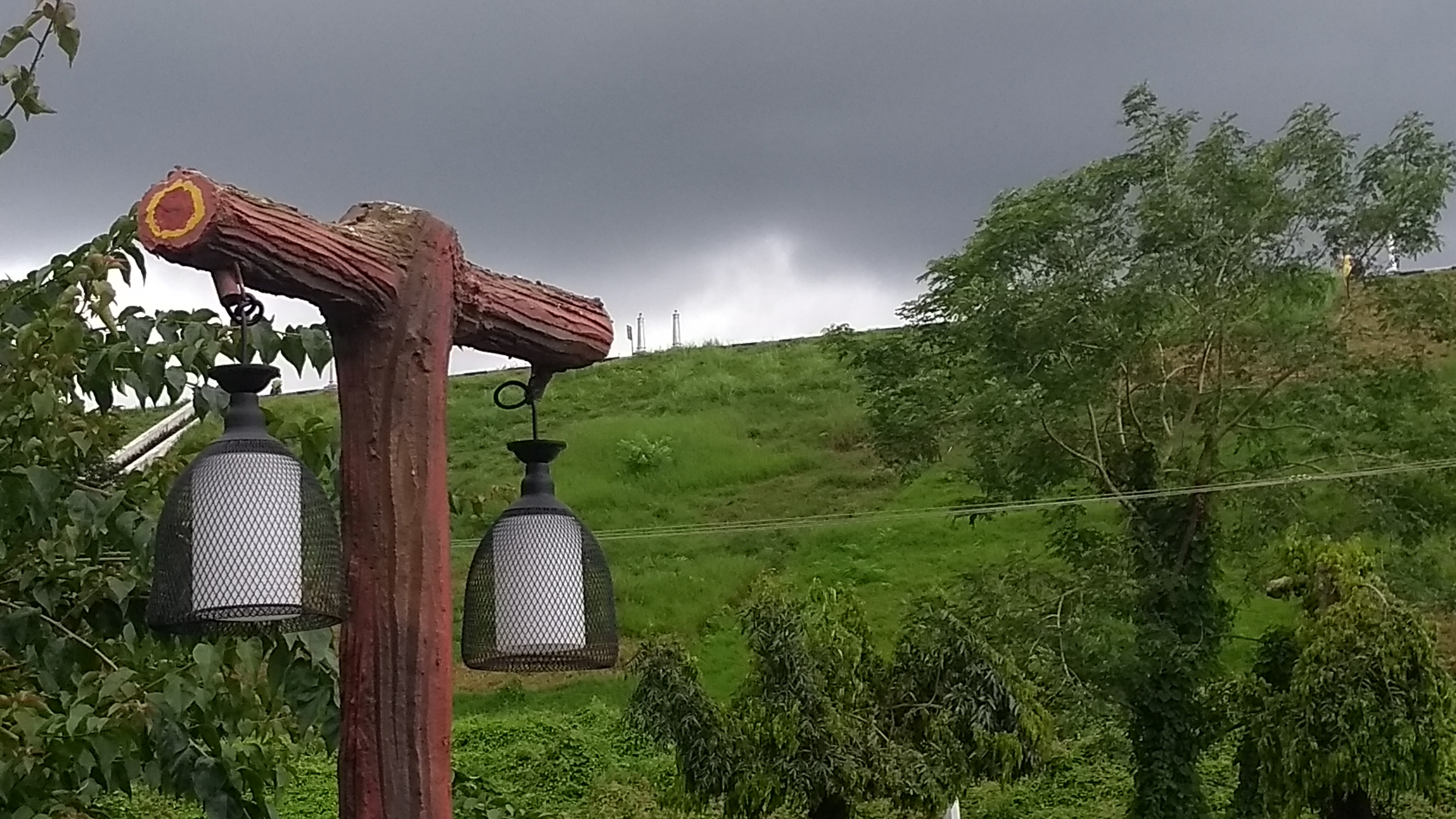
Dam Garden

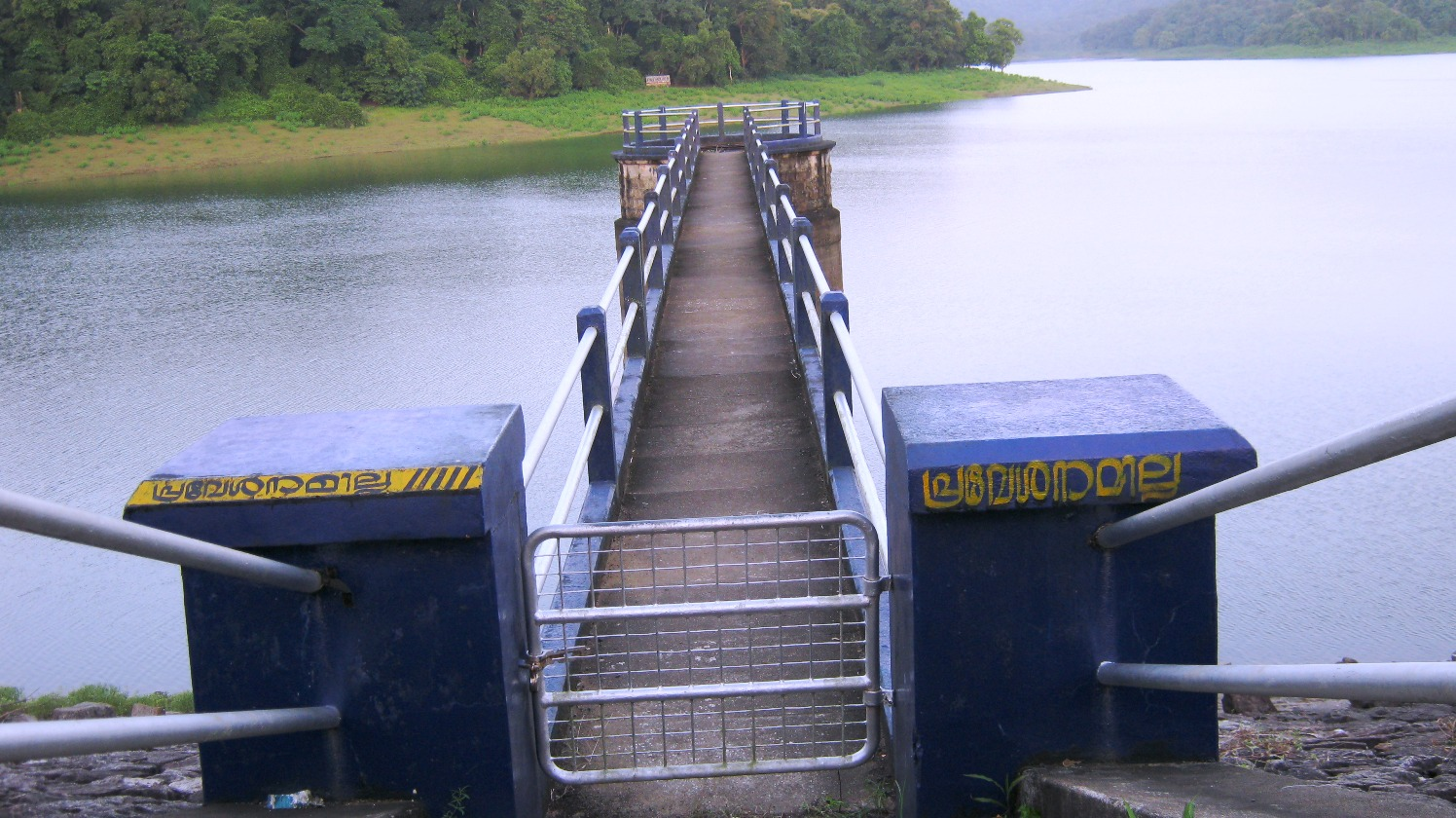

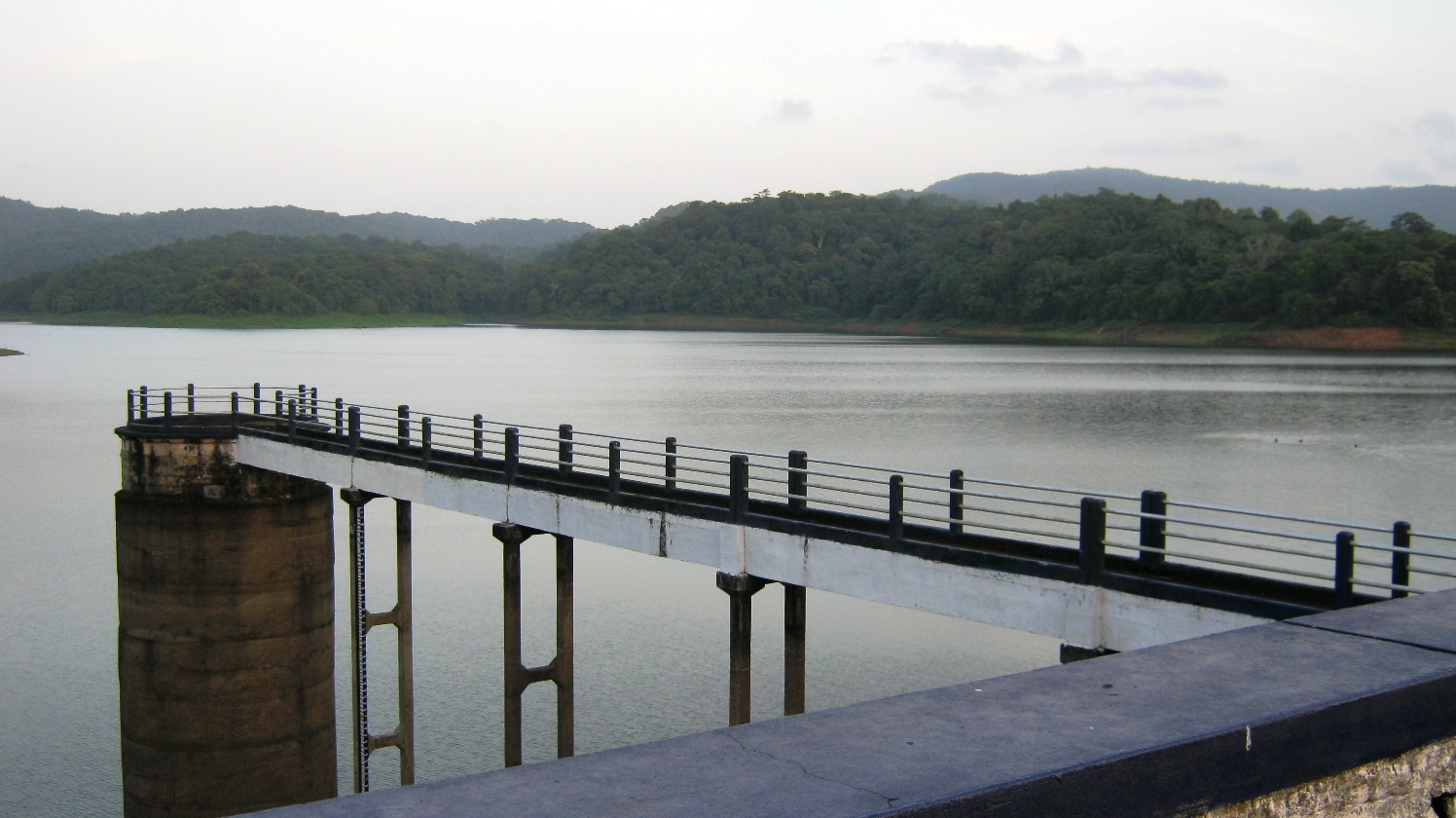

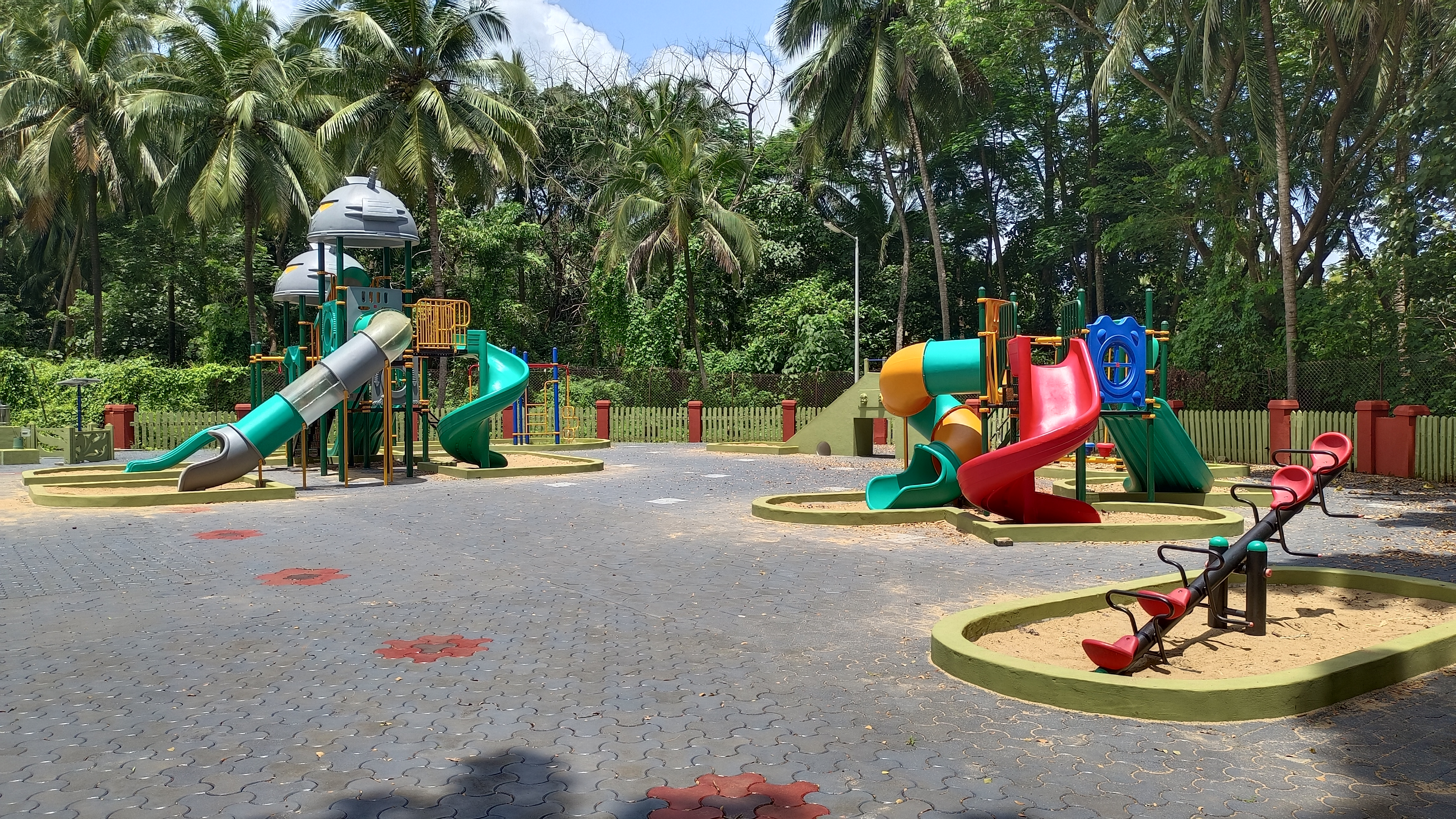

== See also ==
- List of reservoirs and dams in India
