= Vyatipāta =

Concept in Indian astronomy and astrology

In Indian astronomy and astrology, vyatipāta and vaidhṛti (or, vaidhṛta) are two moments in the regular motion of the sun and the moon in the zodiac characterized by their certain special relative positions. These terms are also used to denote two of the 27 Nityayoga-s: vyatipāta is the 17th nityayoga and vaidhṛti is the 27th nityayoga.

== Definitions ==
Sūrysiddhānta defines vyatipāta and vaidhṛti as follows (Sūrysiddhānta Chapter IX Pātādhikāra verses 1 and 2):

- When the sun and moon are upon the same side of either solstice, and when, the sum of their longitudes being a circle, they are of equal declination, it is styled vaidhṛta.
- When the moon and sun are upon opposite sides of either solstice, and their minutes of declination are the same, it is vyatipāta, the sum of their longitudes being a half-circle.

The term pāta in the present context means literally "fall," and hence also either "fault, transgression," or " calamity." The term was probably first applied to the moon's nodes, because they were the points of danger in her revolution, near which the sun or herself was liable to fall into the jaws of Rāhu. Why the time when the sun and moon are equally distant from the equator should be looked upon as so especially unfortunate is not easy to discover. When the equal declinations are of opposite direction, the aspect is denominated vaidhṛta, or vaidhṛti. It has been noted above that it is the name of the last nityayoga. The name of the other aspect (pāta), which occurs when the sun and moon are equally removed from the equator upon the same side of it, is vyatipāta, which may be rendered "very excessive sin or calamity." This, too, is the name of one of the nityayoga-s, but not of that one which occurs when the sum of longitudes of the sun and moon is 180 degrees.

The specification that the pāata-s take place when the sum of longitudes equals a circle or a half-circle respectively, or when the two luminaries are equally distant from either solstice, or either equinox, is not to be understood as exact: this would be the case if the moon had no motion in latitude; but owing to that motion, the equality of declinations, which is the main thing, occurs at a time somewhat removed from that of equality of distance from the equinoxes: the latter is called madhyapāta, "the mean occurrence of the pāta."

Positions of the sun and the moon at an approximate vaidhrti with the sun and moon symmetrically placed about the autumnal equinox, so that their tropical longitudes sum to 360 degrees.	Positions of the sun and the moon at an approximate vyatipata with the sun and moon located at equal distances from the summer solstice, with longitudes summing to 180 degrees.	An occurrence of vaidhrti asymmetrically configured about the autumnal equinox, with the declinations of the sun and the moon being equal.	An occurrence of vyatipat asymmetrically configured about the summer solstice, with the declinations of the sun and the moon being equal.

Chapter XI Pātādhikāra of Sūrysiddhānta is devoted entirely to a discussion on vyatipāta and vaidhṛti. Among other things, the chapter discusses the malignant aspects of the pāata-s, methods to find the longitude of the sun and moon when their declinations are equal, methods to determine the duration of the aspect, and the moment of its beginning and end, etc. According to Burgess: "Of all the chapters in the treatise, this is the one which has least interest and value."

== Records of vyatīpāta-s in stone inscriptions ==
This term vyatīpāta appears in several stone inscriptions. The contexts of the inscriptions may be grants, donations to temples, records of death of war heroes, self-immolation of saints or women committing sati. A detailed study of these inscriptions has yielded valuable information about eclipses and other celestial events like planetary conjunctions.

== See also ==
- Nityayoga
