= History and culture of Kottarakkara =

The history and culture of Kottarakkara in Kerala, India has a rich history. it used to be a palace in the 14th and 15th centuries. In fact, the name "Kottarakkara" means "land of palaces."

== Etymology ==
Kottarakkara, a compound word made up of the words Kottaram, meaning "palace", and kara meaning "land", literally means "land of palaces". The area which had several palaces was thus named "Kottarakkara."

Kathakali traced its origin to the ritualistic (tantric) period of the Vedic Age and connected its growth to popular, folk dance dramas. It was believed that Kathakali was conceived from Krishnanattam, the dance drama on the life and activities of Lord Krishna created by the Samoothirippadu (Samoothiri, Swamy Thirumulpad or Zamorin) of Calicut. The legend is as follows: Once Kottarakkara Thampuran the Raja of Kottarakkara who was attracted by the tone of the Krishnanattam requested the Samoothirippadu for the loan of a troupe of performers on the eve of some festive occasion. Due to internal feuds and political rivalry between them, the Samoothirippadu refused to send the performers and insulted with the remarks: "It is useless to depute the troupe, because Kottarakkara Thespian’s court would be neither able to appreciate nor understand anything of the highly artistic Krishnanattam and the high standard of the performance". Here the political rivalry between the two chieftains leads to the art rivalry. So Kottarakkara Thampuran initiated a parallel mode of entertainment, which he called Ramanattam which was later transformed into Aattakatha, and yet later into Kathakali. While Krishnanattam is based on the stories of Lord Krishna’s activities, Ramanaattam described the complete story of Lord Raman. Krishnanattam was written in Sanskrit, "the language of the Gods". Ramanaattam was in Malayalam, the language of the people. The use of Malayalam, the local language (albeit as a mix of Sanskrit and Malayalam, called Manipravalam), has also helped the literature of Kathakali become more understandable for the average audience. By the end of the seventeenth century, the finished product of Ramanaattam was placed before the world under the title Kathakali.

== History ==
=== As a palace town ===
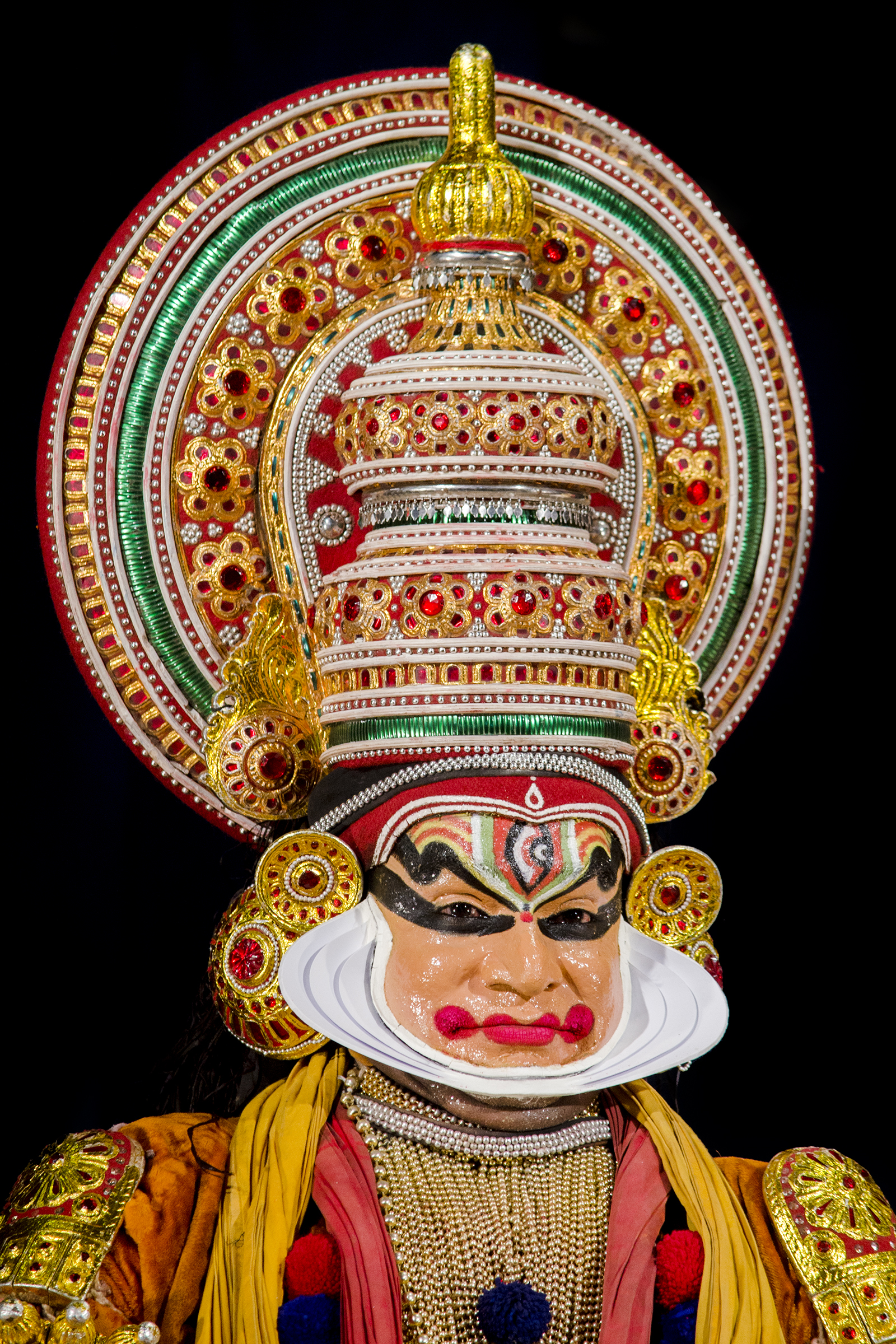
A close-up of a Kathakali artist

Historically, the small town was known as the land of palaces of kings in Kerala. Its earliest known palace construction is traced to the 14th century. This is attributed to the dynasty of Ilayidathu (also known as Kunninmel), who established themselves here. During the period 1383–1444, Chera Udaya Marthanda Verma ruled over Venad and built his palace here. It was then the capital of the Ilayidathu Swarupam (also spelled Elayadutharai Swarupam), which is testified by the remnants of seven palaces.

In the 17th century, history also records the emergence of an early format of the famous Kathakali dance drama known as Ramanattam, which emerged as a result of the rivalry of the kings of the two neighbouring principalities of the Raja of Kottarakkara and that of the Manaveda, Zamorin of Kozhikode (the Raja of Kozhikode, then known as Calicut, who had developed the Krishnattam (an eighty-day dance drama format). Manaveda refused the request of the Prince of Kottarakkara to send the Krisnaattam troupe to Kottakkara with a snide remark that "no connoisseur at Kottarakkara could appreciate Krishnaattam". Prince Tampuran felt insulted and then decided to take it a challenge and invented his own form of the dance form which was called the Ramanattam with the Rama theme developed in the Krishnaattam style. Thus, Kottarakkara town got the distinction of being the first in Kerala from where the famous Indian classical dance form originated when it was the capital of the Elayadathu Swarupam, the principality in central Kerala, which was a branch of the Travanacore royal family. He adopted eight stories into creating into dance drama formats which were known as Ramanattam, meaning dance related to Rama (of the Hindu epic Ramayana fame), which were precursors to the Kathakalli which developed in later years with amalgamation with other formats of Krishnattam and early forms of Kathakalii; however only three formats of this creation are performed now as part of Kathakalli. Four more dance drama episodes of Kathakalli plays developed 200 years later, after Ramanattam.

=== Colonial era ===
In 1739, the Dutch and allied forces had attacked the Travancore forces who were backed by the British at Kottarakkara. The Dutch then installed the princess of Elayadathu Swarupam, who had escaped earlier from Kottarakkara to Tekkumkur as the ruler of the state. In return, the princess had gifted to the Dutch a large farm about 15 miles from Kollam and also at Bichnor where they established their "redoubt". Followed by this victory, on 30 December 1739 the armed forces than attacked the Travancore and won many battles.

However, in the 18th century, the last queen of this dynasty surrendered her kingdom to Marthanda Varma (her cousin), following which the queen went to Cochin where she sought asylum from the Dutch. The Dutch had provided her a pension of 2 rupees and 5 annas.

After Tipu Sultan invaded Malabar, Dharma Raja the royal family member of North Malabar settled in Kottarakara. In the mid 19th century, the family line disintegrated.

In 1835, it became part of the administrative unit of Kollam as part of the Travancore state which had two revenue divisions, the Kottayam and the Kollam. In 1949, it became part of the integrated state of Travancore and Cochin. The town Village, Block and Jilla and, of course, the state and central governments.
