= Manaveda =

Kerala author

Manaveda (Malayalam മാനവേദന്‍ (1585–1658 AD) was one of the Zamorin Rajas of Kozhikode in northern Kerala, and is renowned as the author of Krishnanattam. This art is a dance drama and presents the story of Krishna in a series of eight plays.

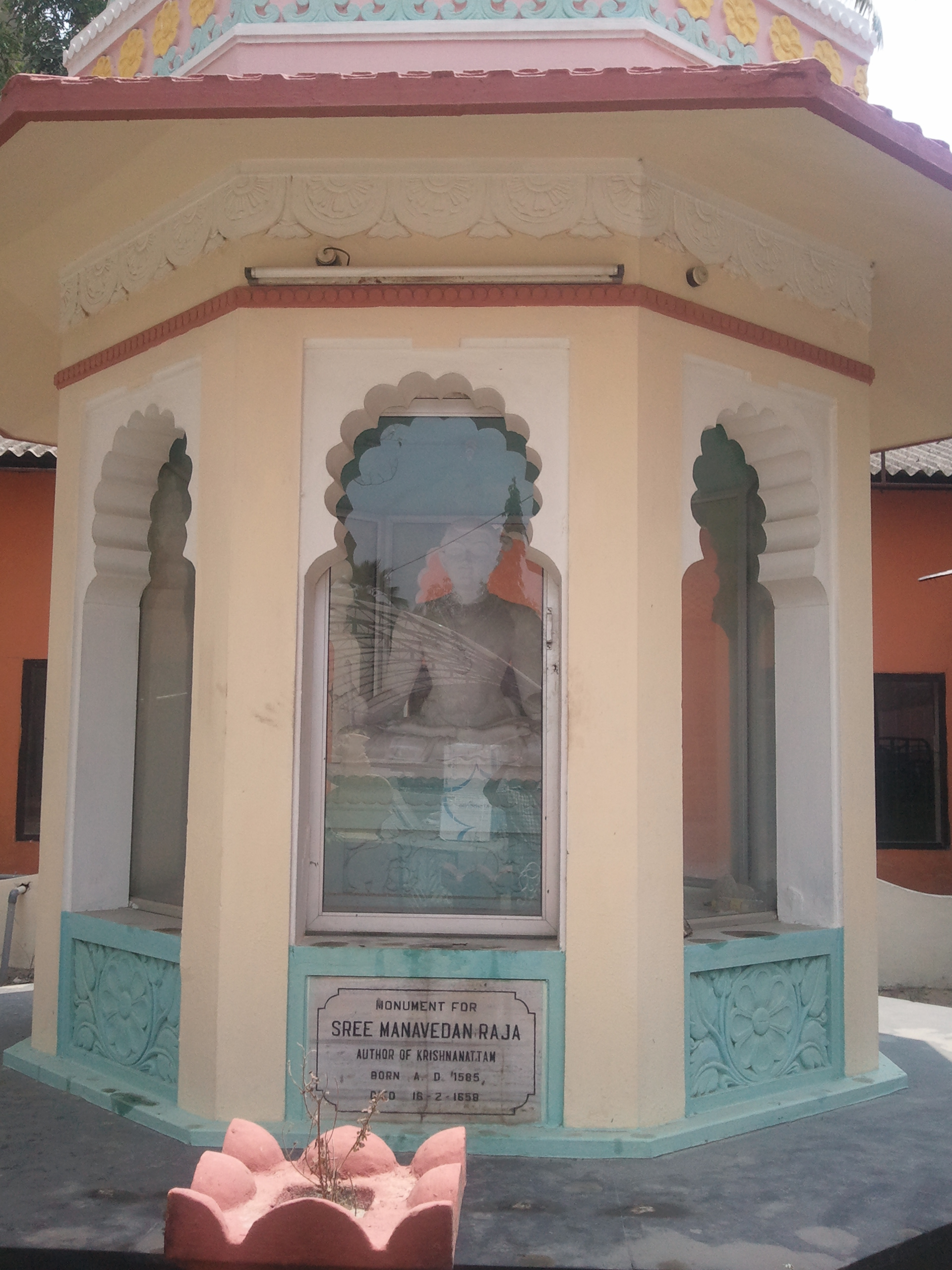
Monument of Manaveda in Guruvayur

The second Manaveda (Ruling period 1658-1662 AD) Asvati Tirunal Manaveda is the one who destroyed the power of the Portuguese with the help of Dutch. He reinstated the Mutta Tavali Prince on the throne of Cochin.

As he was a patron of letters, Melpathur Narayana Bhattathiri was quite probably a friend of him.

== Early life ==
He was born to the royal family of the Zamorin Rajas of Kozhikode in 1585. Though much is not known about parents and childhood, it is said he had education from Anayath Krishna pisharody and Desamangalath varrier. He grew up into a poetic genius and a farsighted ruler.

== Contributions ==
Only two of his books are available now - Krishnanattam (text is also called Krishnageethi) and Purva bharatha chambu, both written in Sanskrit. The later was completed in A.D 1643, 10 years before Krishnanattam. His other books are believed to be destroyed in the fire which gutted Zamorin palace when Hyderali of Mysore attacked in 1766.

== Krishnageethi ==
The Sanskrit text based on which Krishnanattam was created was written on A.D 1653, aged 68. It consists of eight plays: Avataram, Kaliyamardanam, Rasakrida, Kamsavadham, Swayamvaram, Banayuddham, Vividavadham, and Swargarohanam. It is based on 10th and 11th skandhas of Bhagavata Purana dealing solely with the story of Krishna. It has also gained inspirations from Gita Govinda of Jayadeva, Sree krishna vilaasam Mahakavya and Narayaniyam of Melpathur Narayana Bhattathiri.

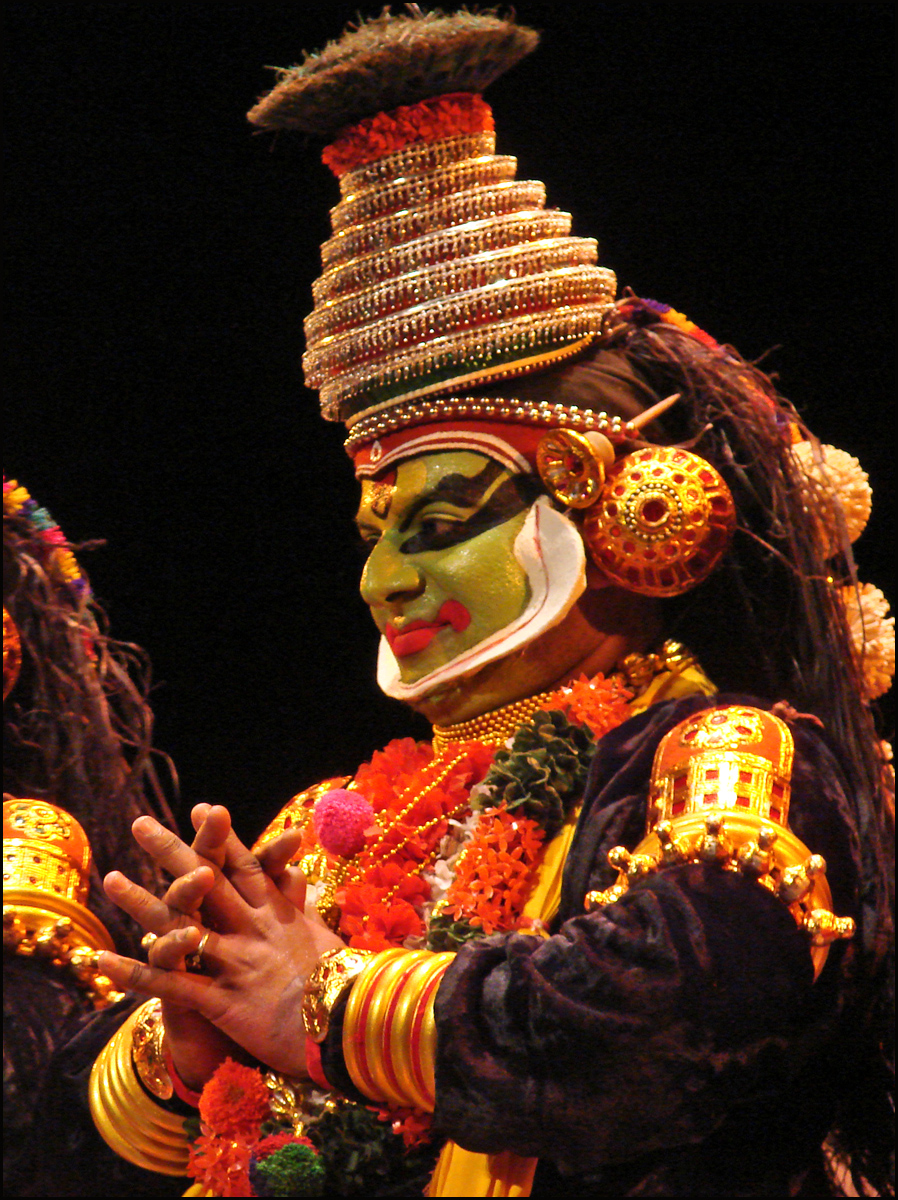
Krishnan

The opening sloka of Krishnanattam is:

Jagathi sukritilokai: nandithaananthidasa
Kalaviranithavamsiibhasamanasamana
Pashupayuvathibhogya devathadevatha sa
Sachalajaladhapaliimechaka me chakaasthu

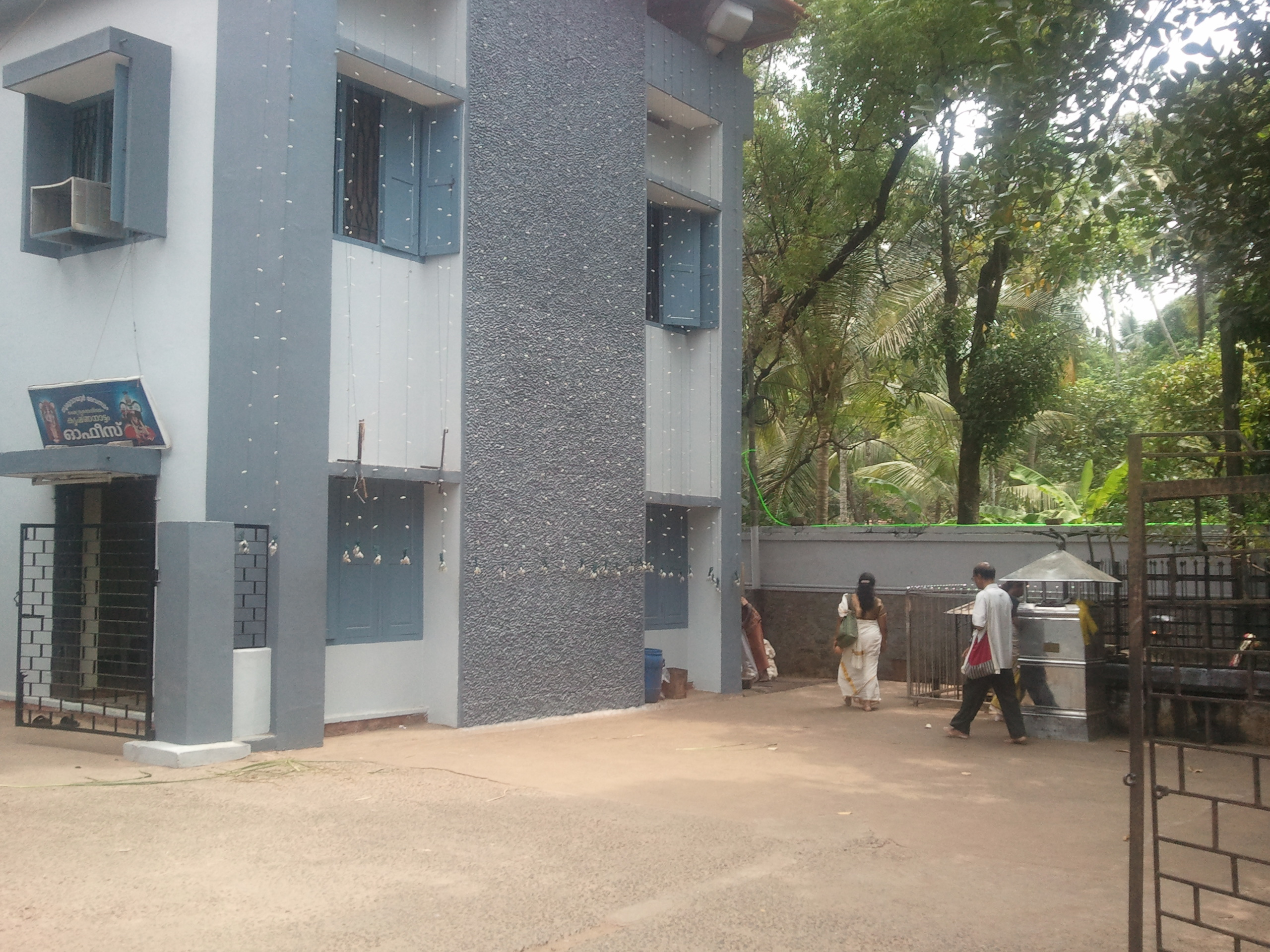
Krishnanattam kalari in Guruvayur near 'Office Ganapathy' temple where the art is taught.

Apart from such slokas it is also adorned by many padyageethams like that of Gita Govinda of Jayadeva. It is a masterpiece work in Sanskrit by a Keralite.

=== The stories ===
Staged at Melpathur auditorium during utsavam

The eight plays are: Avataram, Kaliyamardanam, Rasakrida, Kamsavadham, Swayamvaram, Banayuddham, Vividavadham and Swargarohanam. its easily memorised by a mnemonic "a-ka-ra-ka-swa-bha-vi-swa". On the ninth day, Avatharam is repeated.

The various benefits of Krishnanattam as an offering are:

- Avatharam for a birth of a child.
- Kaliyamardhanam to remove the effect of poison.
- Rasakreeda well-being of unmarried girls, to end disputes between couples.
- Kamsavaddham to remove enemies.
- Swayamvaram for a happy matrimony.
- Bana yuddham to remove impoverishment, for good farm production.
- Vividha vadham to eliminate poverty and increase yield from farms.
- Swargarohanam for peace of a departed soul.

== The legend ==
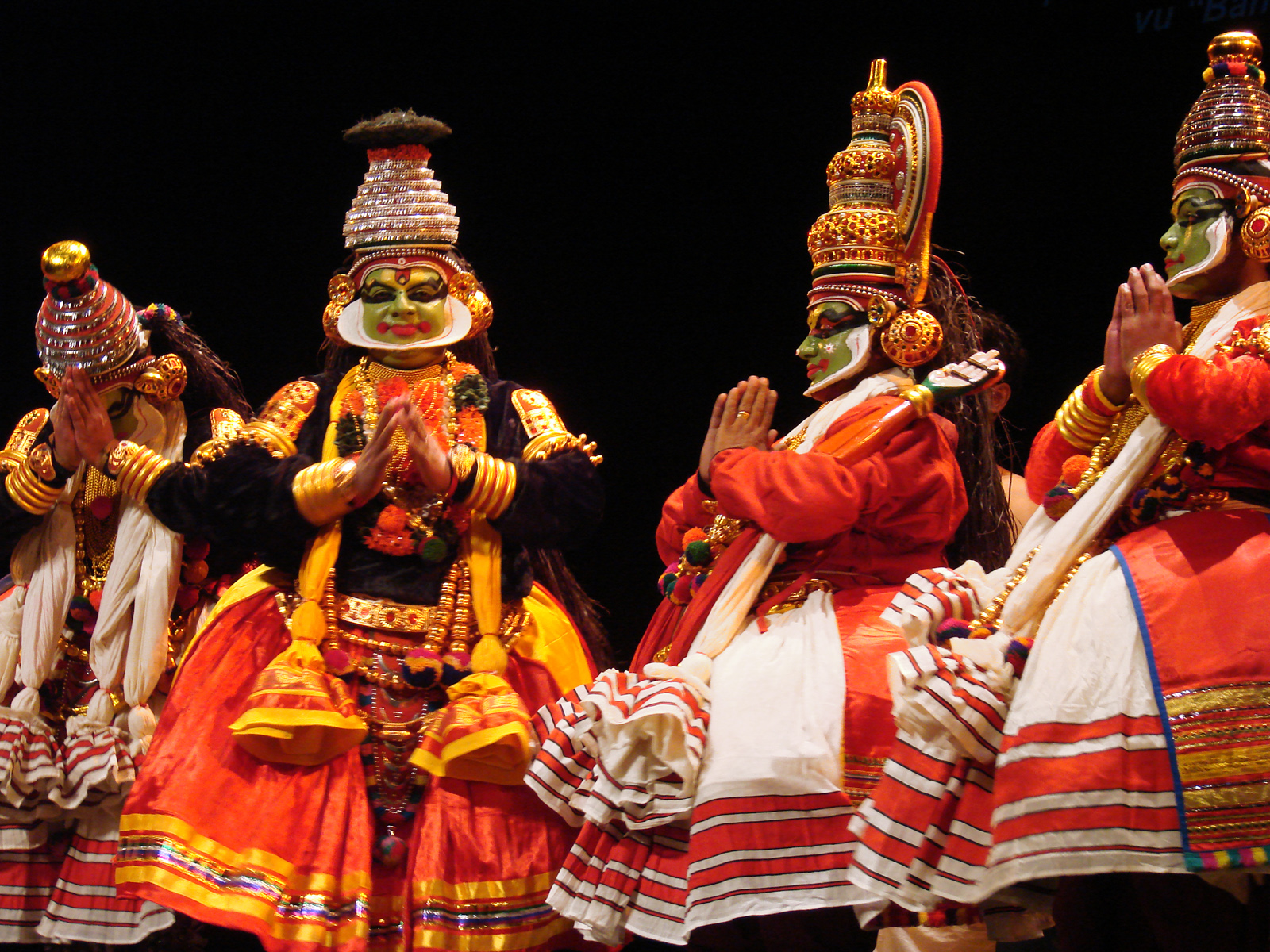
Krishnanattam

King Manaveda told Vilwamangalam about his ambition to view Krishna. The next day the Swamiyar told him that Guruvayurappan has given his consent and Manavedan can see Guruvayurappan playing in the early hours of the morning at the platform of the Elanji tree. He could only see and not touch Him. When as per this agreement, Manavedan saw Guruvayurappan in the form of little child Sri Krishna, he was so excited that he forgot himself and, rushed to embrace little Sree Krishna.Guruvayoorappan immediately disappeared saying, "Vilwamangalam did not tell me that this will happen ". However, Manavedan got one peacock feather from the headgear of Bhagavan Krishna.

The peacock feather was incorporated in the headgear for the character of Sri Krishna in the dance drama Krishnanattam based on his own text krishnageethi which is composed of 8 chapters. It was performed near the sanctum sanctorum of the Guruvayur Temple. On the ninth day, Avatharam was repeated as the Zamorin felt that it was not auspicious to end the series with the demise of Lord Krishna. The blessed art form is still maintained by Guruvayur devaswom and staged as an offering by devotees.

== Late life ==
After advent of Krishnanattam at age of 68 he was till his demise involved in improvising the dancedrama. He died at Thrissur in 1658 and was cremated at Guruvayur south of Guruvayurappan temple. A statue was built at this place, which at present is located near panjajanyam guest house in guruvayur.

== Gallery ==
Krishnanattam(കൃഷ്ണനാട്ടം)

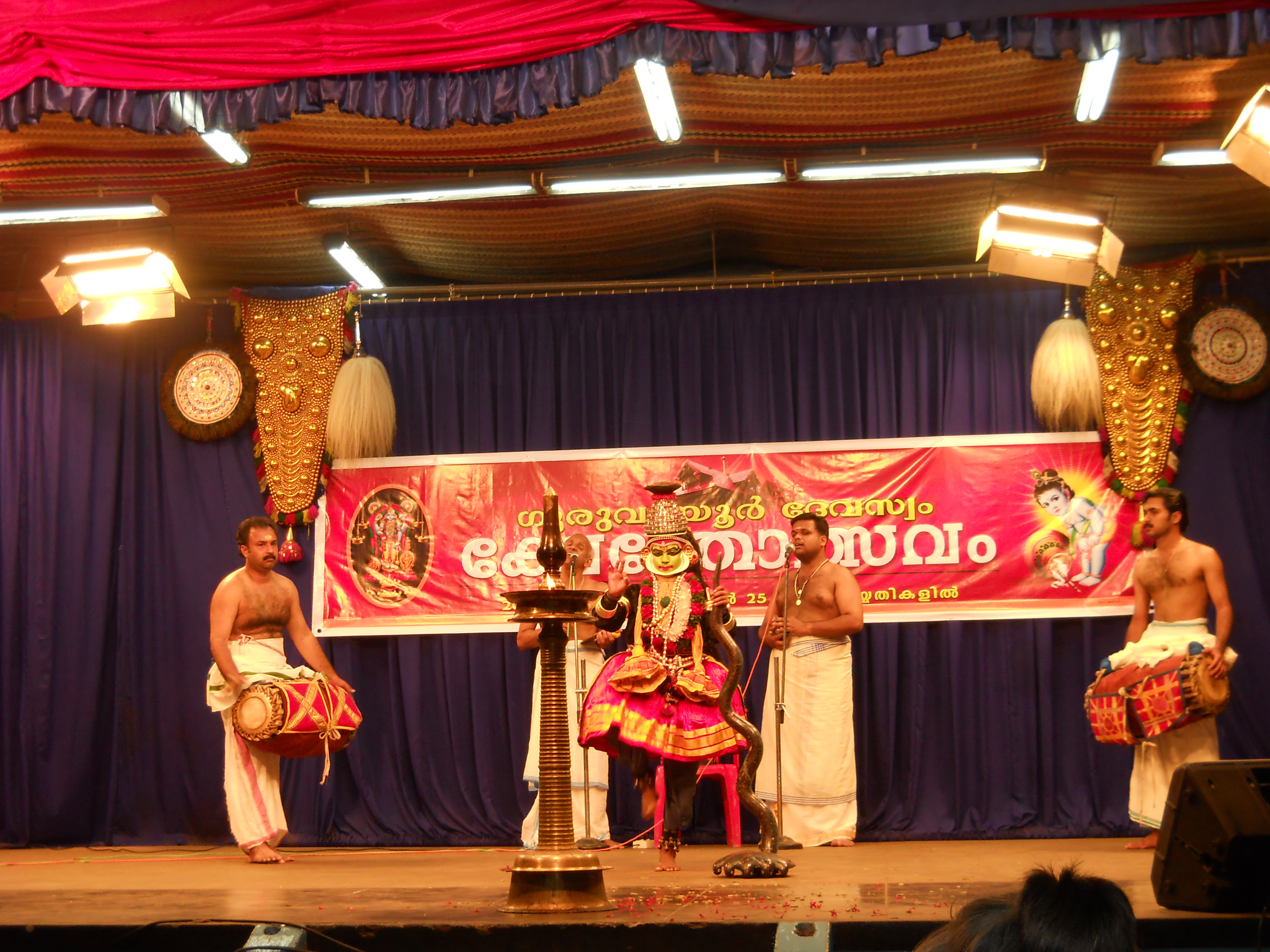

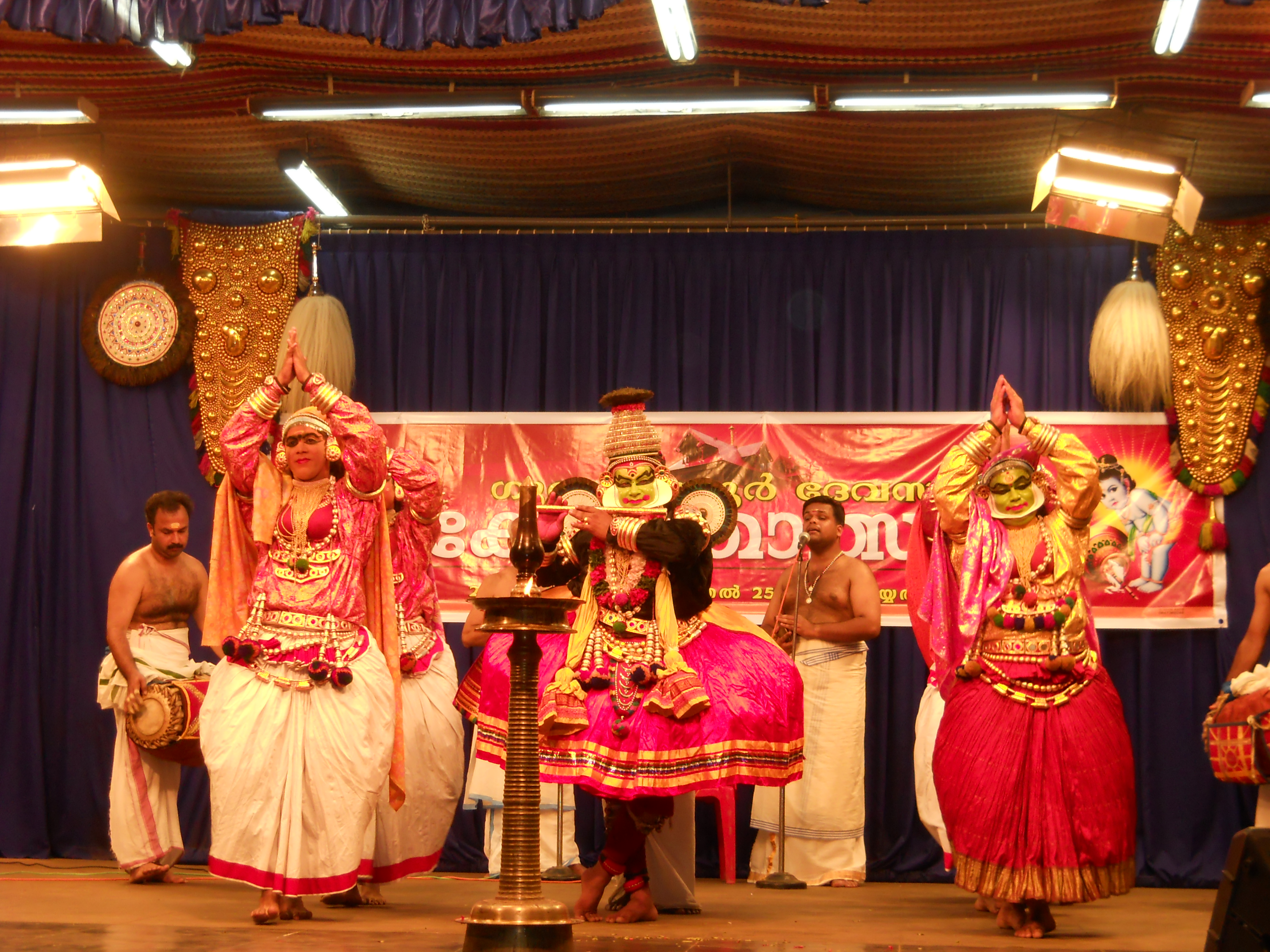

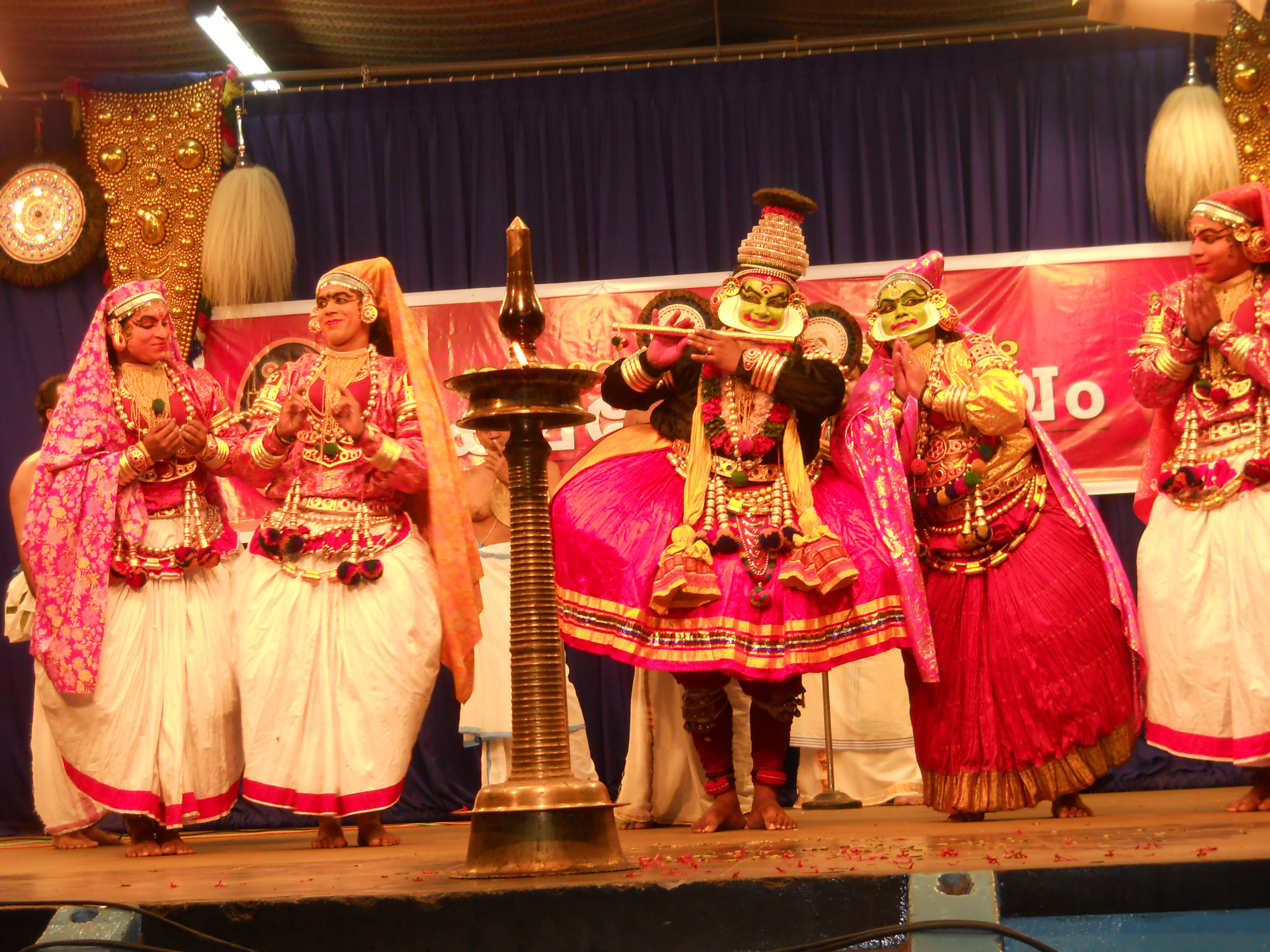

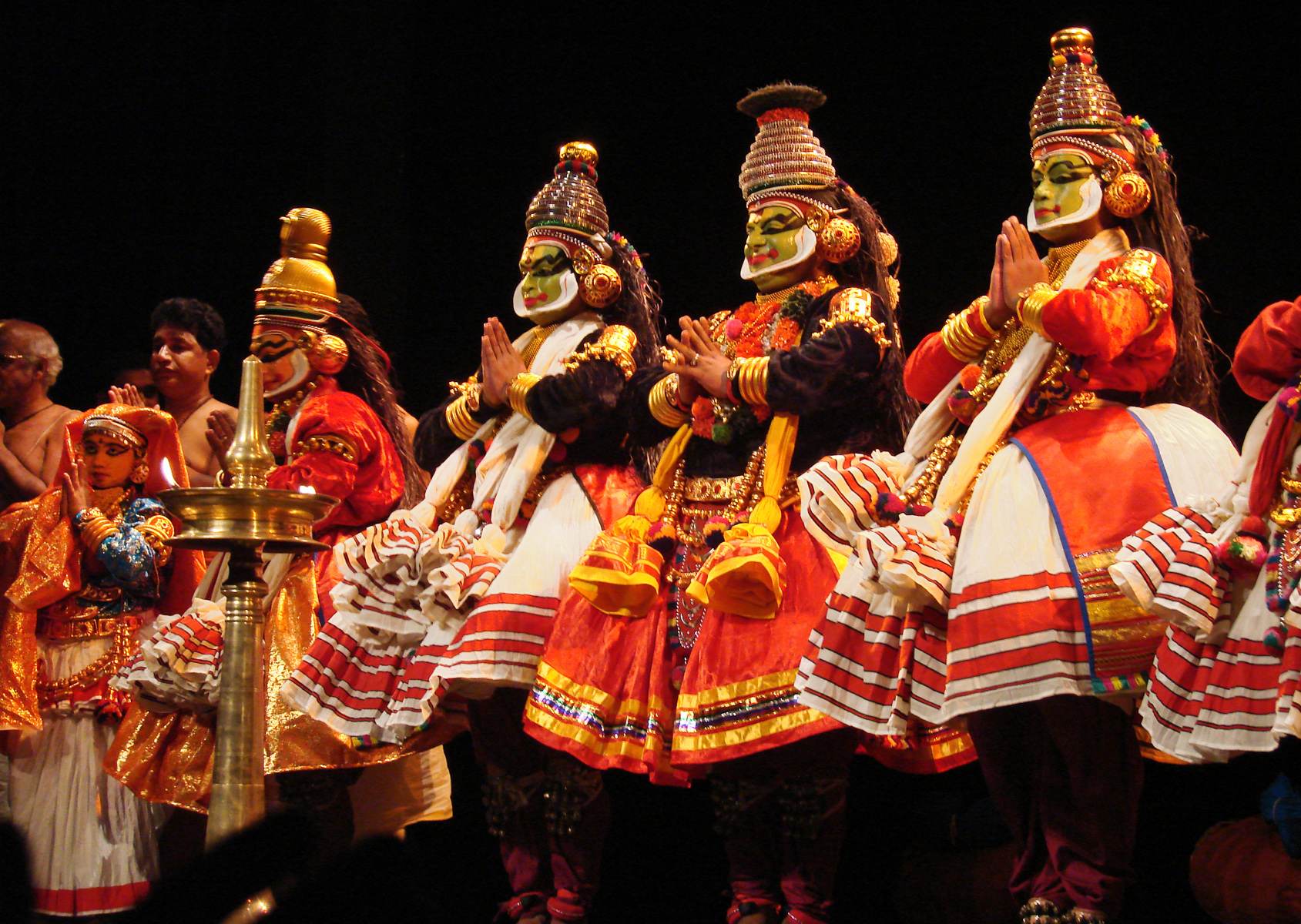

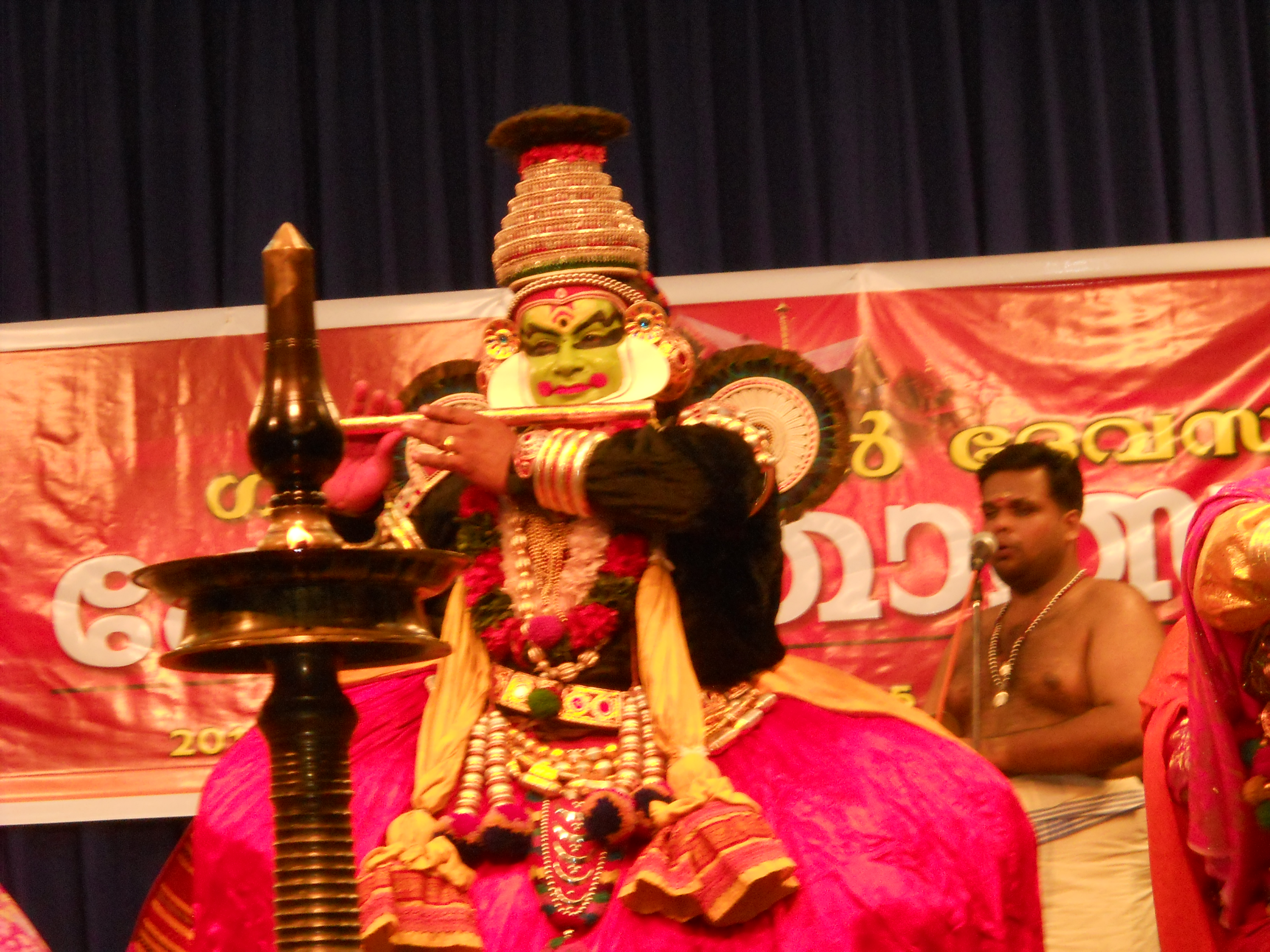
കൃഷ്ണനാട്ടം_.jpg
