= Acyuta Piṣāraṭi =

Indian scholar (1550–1621)

Acyuta Piṣāraṭi (c. 1550 at Thrikkandiyur (aka Kundapura), Tirur, Kerala, India – 7 July 1621 in Kerala), also known as Achyuta Pisharati or Achyutha Pisharadi, was a Sanskrit grammarian, astrologer, astronomer and mathematician who studied under Jyeṣṭhadeva and was a member of Madhava of Sangamagrama's Kerala school of astronomy and mathematics.

== Works ==
He discovered the techniques of 'the reduction of the ecliptic'. He authored Sphuta-nirnaya, Raasi-gola-sphuta-neeti (raasi meaning zodiac, gola meaning sphere and neeti roughly meaning rule), Karanottama (1593) and a four- chapter treatise Uparagakriyakrama on lunar and solar eclipses.

1. Praveśaka: An introduction to Sanskrit grammar.
2. Karaṇottama: Astronomical work dealing with the computation of the mean and true longitudes of the planets, with eclipses, and with the vyatipātas of the sun and moon.
3. Uparāgakriyākrama (1593): Treatise on lunar and solar eclipses.
4. Sphuṭanirṇaya: Astronomical text.
5. Chāyāṣṭaka: Astronomical text.
6. Uparāgaviṃśati: Manual on the computation of eclipses.
7. Rāśigolasphuṭānīti: Work concerned with the reduction of the moon's true longitude in its own orbit to the ecliptic.
8. Veṇvārohavyākhyā: Malayalam commentary on the Veṇvāroha of Mādhava of Saṅgamagrāma (ca. 1340–1425) written at the request of the Azhvanchery Thambrakkal.
9. Horāsāroccaya: An adaptation of the Jātakapaddhati of Śrīpati.

== Narayaneeyam ==
Pisharati is known to have scolded and provoked an errant Narayana to take up the Brahmin's duties of prayer and religious practices. He accepted Narayana as his student. Later when Pisharati was struck with paralysis (or rheumatism by another account), Narayana, unable to bear the pain of his dear guru, by way of Gurudakshina took the disease upon himself. As a result, Pisharati is said to have been cured, but no medicine could cure Narayana. As a last resort, Narayana went to Guruvayur and requested Thunchaththu Ramanujan Ezhuthachan, a great devotee of Guruvayoorappan, to suggest a remedy for his disease. Ramajunan Ezhuthachan advised him to compose a poetical work on the Avatars (incarnations) of Lord Vishnu beginning with that of Matsya (Fish). Narayana composed beautiful slokas in praise of Lord Guruvayurappan and recited them before the deity. He was soon cured of his disease.

The book of slokas written by Narayana were named Narayaneeyam. The day on which Narayana dedicated his Narayaneeyam to Sri Guruvayurappan is celebrated as "Narayaneeyam Dinam" every year at Guruvayur.

== See also ==
- Melpathur Narayana Bhattathiri
- Narayaneeyam
- Indian mathematics
- List of astronomers and mathematicians of the Kerala school

== Additional reading ==
- David Pingree. "Acyuta Piṣāraṭi". Dictionary of Scientific Biography.
- S. Venkitasubramonia Iyer. "Acyuta Piṣāroṭi; His Date and Works" in JOR Madras', 22 (1952–1953), 40–46.
- K. V. Sarma (2008), "Acyuta Pisarati", Encyclopaedia of the History of Science, Technology, and Medicine in Non-Western Cultures (2nd edition) edited by Helaine Selin, p. 19, Springer, ISBN 978-1-4020-4559-2.
- K. Kunjunni Raja. The Contribution of Kerala to Sanskrit Literature (Madras, 1958), pp. 122–125.
- "Astronomy and Mathematics in Kerala" in Brahmavidyā, 27 (1963), 158–162.
