= Thrikkandiyoor =

Village in Kerala, India

Location of Thrikkandiyoor

Thrikkandiyoor is a village in Tirur Block in Malappuram district of Kerala state in India. The village is known for a Shiva Temple located at the heart of the village. Devotees of Shiva believe that the idol in the temple was installed by Parashurama, the creator of Kerala. It is also believed that this is one of the 108 temples in Kerala constructed under the directions of Parashurama. Another feature of the temple is that there is a clean pond facing the temple, and the area of pond is exactly equal to area of the temple land. The village is adjacent to Tirur Municipal Town and the Shiva temple is located about 2 km to the south of Tirur Railway Station. Thunchan Parambu, the birthplace of Thunchath Ramanujan Ezhuthachan, is located in Tirur Town.

== Historical importance ==
Although Thrikkandiyoor is now a sleepy village with village folks living out their daily uneventful days, a few centuries ago the village and the surrounding villages were the center of great intellectual activities. The location of Thunchan Parambu, the birthplace of Thunchath Ramanujan Ezhuthachan (fl. 16th century), who is considered to be the father of Malayalam language, bears testimony to this claim. The legendary poet and grammarian Melpathur Narayana Bhattathiri (1560 – 1646) was also a son of these areas.

The Thrikkandiyoor village has a prominent place in the history of Kerala school of astronomy and mathematics. Many of the much admired and highly celebrated members of the school flourished in the village or in the immediate geographical areas surrounding the village. The most famous of them all was Kelallur Nilakantha Somayaji (1444 - 1545), author of several treatises on astronomy including his magnum opus Tantrasamgraha. His family house has been traced to the present Etamana house occupied by distant relations after the extinction of Nilakantha's family. Jyeṣṭhadeva (c.1500 – c.1575), author of Yuktibhasa, was a Nambudiri belonging to the Parangngottu family which still exists in the vicinity of Trikkandiyur. Yuktibhasa has a unique place in the history of mathematics in the whole of India. Firstly, it is a technical book on astronomy and mathematics composed completely in the local language, pure and simple Malayalam. Secondly, it is the first and perhaps the only book on mathematics in a local language which contains complete proofs of all the results stated therein. Thirdly, many of the results stated in the book were discovered in Europe only at least two centuries after Yuktibhasa was composed. Nilakantha Somayaji's student Sankara Variar (c.1500 - c.1560) was also a prominent member of the Kerala school who flourished in Thrikkandiyoor even though his family was employed in the service of a temple at Thrikkutaveli near Ottappalam. Variar's works include a commentary on Nilakantha Somayaji's Tantrasamgraha, a partial commentary on Bhaskara II's Lilavati. Another prominent member of the school who flourished in Thrikkandiyoor was Achyutha Pisharadi (1550 - 1621) who was a pupil of Jyeshthadeva. His ten or so astronomical works include one composed in 1593. Achyutha Pisharadi was also a teacher of the famous poet and grammarian Melpathur Narayana Bhattathiri (1560 – 1646). He was the first known Indian astronomer to specify the conversion of planetary motion on an inclined orbit to motion on the ecliptic. There were several astronomers and mathematicians of the Kerala who lived and worked not far away from Thrikkandiyoor. The greatest of them all was Madhava of Sangamagrama (c.1340 - c.1425) who is believed to have lived in Kudallur, a village about 25 km south-east of Thrikkandiyur. Parameshvara Nambudiri (1380 – 1460), the promulgator of the Drgganita system of astronomical computations hailed from Alathiyur, a village about 6 km from Thrikkandiyoor. P. P. Divakaran in his scholar work The mathematics in India writes:

"From such circumstantial evidence, historians have been able to piece together an uninterrupted transmission line of teacher to student, from Madhava, born in mid-14th century, to Achyuta (Acyuta Pis.¯arat.i) whose death around 1620 marks a natural termination point for the line. (There were a few others who carried the torch until later, down to the beginning of the 19th century, but they added little original to their legacy). As remarkable as the longevity of the line is the fact that all of them were born, and learned and taught their mathematics, in a handful of villages – Trikkandiyur, Alattiyur, Triprangode and Shukapuram – each a short walk from the other (and from the river). Such a concentration of mathematical talent over a long two centuries and a half was unprecedented, in India or elsewhere, and not to be duplicated until the great university towns of Europe took to mathematical scholarship."
