= Ramanattam =

Type of dance

- Native name: രാമനാട്ടം (Malayalam)
- Genre: Indian classical dance
- Year: 17th century
- Origin: Kerala, India

Ramanattam (Malayalam: രാമനാട്ടം, IAST: Rāmanāṭṭaṃ) is a temple art in Kerala, India. The dance drama presents the story of Rama in a series of eight plays and was created under the patronage of Veera Kerala Varma (AD 1653–1694) alias Kottarakkara Thampuran. Ramanattom is based on a story from the epic Ramayana, covering the incarnation of Rama to the Rama-Ravana War, Ravana's defeat and Rama's crowning at Ayodhya. The story was written by Kottarakkara Thampuran and is divided into eight poetic sections so that each section can be enacted in one day. These eight sections are puthrakameshti, seetha swayamvaram, vicchinnabhishekam, kharavadham, balivadham, thoranayudham, sethubandhanam and yudham (war). Ramanattam is widely believed to be the immediate stem of the well known classical art form of Kerala, Kathakali.

== Origin ==
After the staging and creation of Krishnattam by the then Zamorin Raja of Calicut in 1657 AD, its fame spread all over Kerala. Its success induced the Raja of Kottarakkara (Kottarakkara Thampuran) requested Zamorin to send artists to perform Krishnanattam. on the eve of a wedding taking place in his palace. King Manavedan, then Zamorin of Kozhikode has a troupe that performs Krishnanattam. The king of Kottarakkara sent a messenger to Kozhikode with a letter requesting him to send artists. It is said that due to internal feuds and political rivalry between the chieftains of the neighbouring States, the Zamorin, besides refusing to send the performers, insulted and humiliated the Raja of Kottarakkara with the remark,

" It is useless to depute the troupe, because your (Raja of Kottarakkara's) court would be neither able to appreciate nor understand anything of the highly artistic Krishnattam and the high standard of the performance "

Here the political rivalry between the two chieftains turned into art rivalry and Spurred by this resentment, the Kottarakkara Thampuran, initiating a parallel mode of entertainment, based on epic Ramayana, and named it as Ramanattam (literally meaning life of Rama in dance form). While the Manaveda's Krishnattam was written in Sanskrit, the "language of the gods"; he composed the entire Ramayanam in eight volumes in Manipravalam style.

== Origin of Kathakali ==
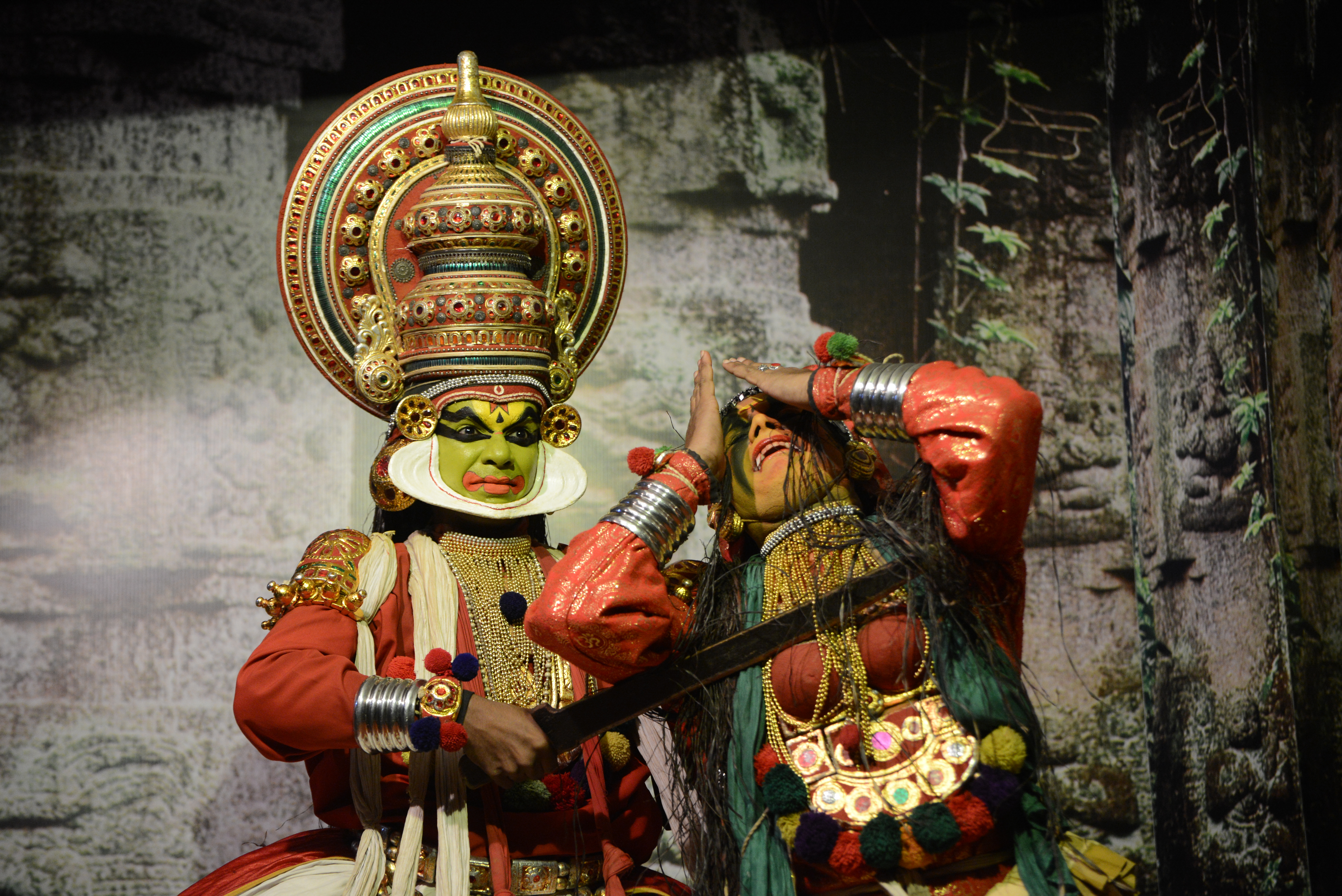
Kathakali

It is believed that the art form of Ramanattam was transformed into a new dance form called Kathakali by the king of Kottayam (Kottayath thampuran), and it was created at the Mridangashaileshwari temple in Muzhakkunn. It was based on epic Mahabharatha. It is also believed that the two art forms, Ramanattam and Krishnanattam were combined to form Kathakali. Kathakali is very similar to Ramanatta in terms of presentation, costuming, acting and background music.
