= Krishnanattam =

Dance drama of the story of Krishna

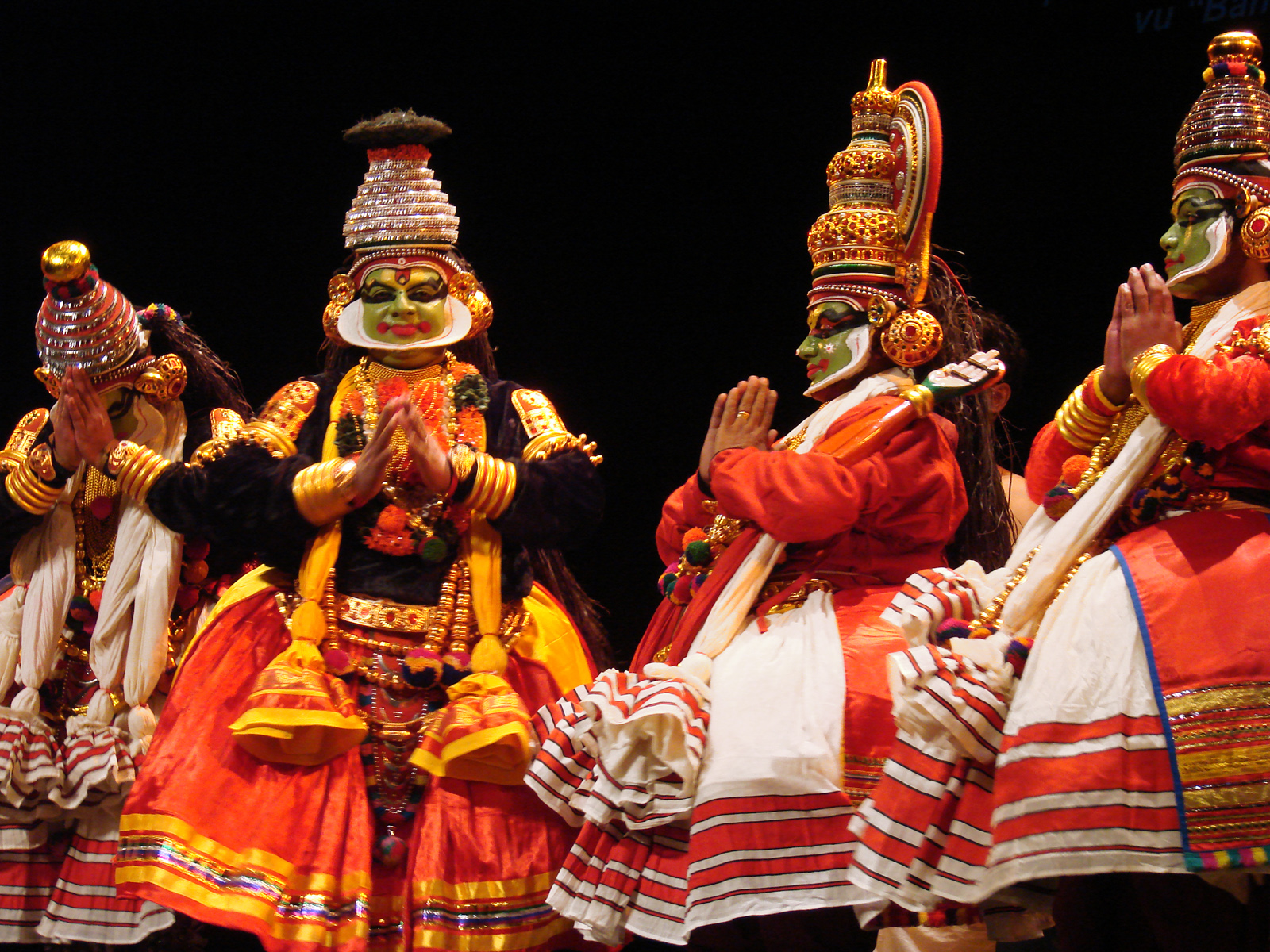
Krishnanattam

Krishnanattam (IAST: Kṛṣṇanāṭṭaṃ) is a temple art in Kerala, India. It is a dance drama and presents the story of Krishna in a series of eight plays and was created by Manaveda (1585–1658 AD), the then Zamorin Raja of Kozhikode in northern Kerala. The eight plays are: Avataram, Kaliyamardanam, Rasakrida, Kamsavadham, Swayamvaram, Banayuddham, Vividavadham and Swargarohanam. It survives in its glory at the Guruvayur Sri Krishna temple (Thrissur district, Kerala, India). It is a direct progenitor of the Indian classical dance drama called Kathakali.

The troupe of players who were maintained by the Zamorin came to Guruvayur Devaswom in 1958, and they are the only troupe of artists who are well maintained by the devaswom till date.

== Origin ==
Krishnanattam is based on Krishnagiti (1654 AD) written by Manaveda, Zamorin Raja of Kozhikode. It is believed that the Zamorin had a vision of Krishna who gave the king a peacock feather, which became the symbol of this dance-drama. Krishnanattam players wear a peacock feather to commemorate the vision of the chieftain.

== The legend ==
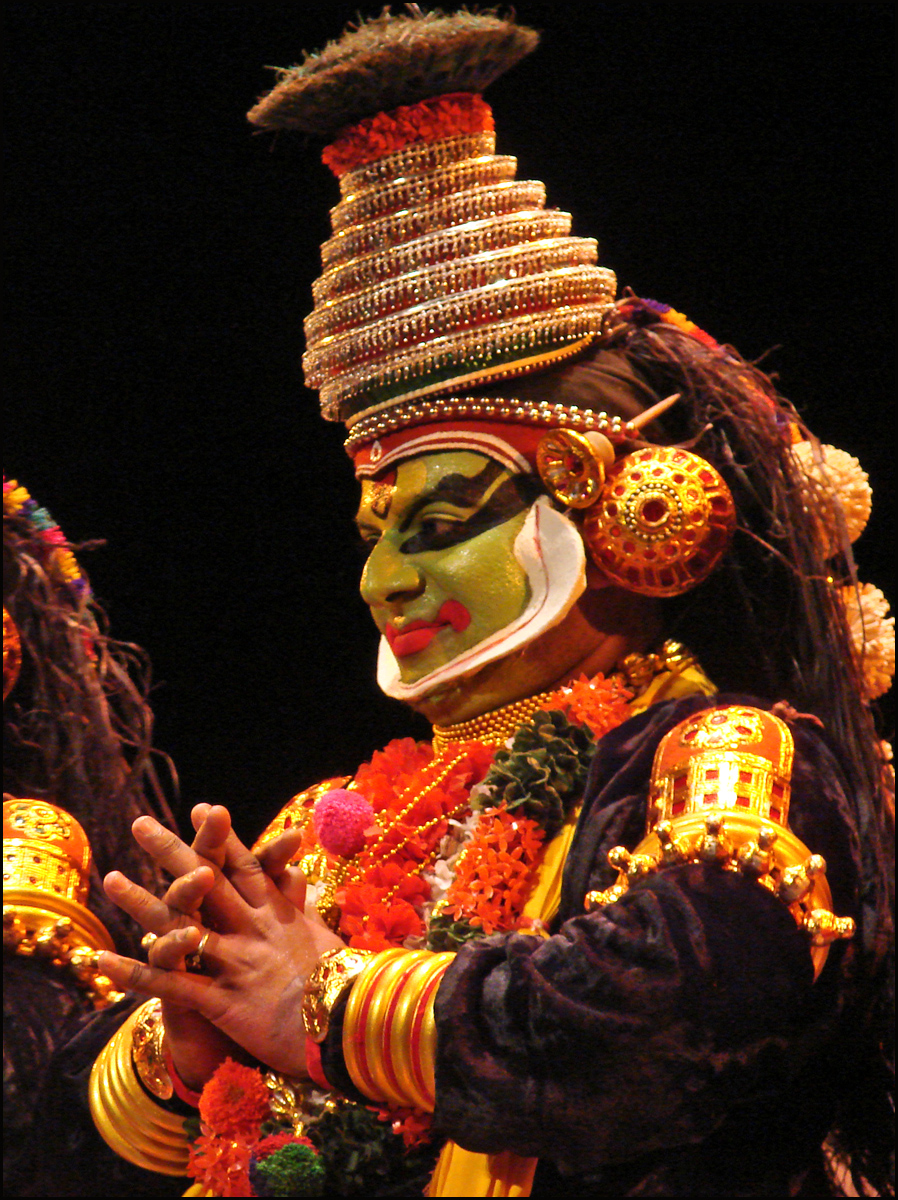
Krishnanattam Mudra

King Manaveda told Vilwamangalam about his ambition to view Krishna. The next day the Swamiyar told him that Guruvayurappan has given his consent and Manaveda can see Guruvayurappan playing in the early hours of the morning at the platform of the Elanji tree. He could only see and not touch Him. When as per this agreement, Manaveda saw Guruvayurappan in the form of little child Sri Krishna, he was so excited that he forgot himself and, rushed to embrace little Sree Krishna. Guruvayoorappan immediately disappeared saying, "Vilwamangalam did not tell me that this will happen". However, Manaveda got one peacock feather from the headgear of Bhagavan Krishna. The peacock feather was incorporated in the headgear for the character of Sri Krishna in the dance drama Krishnanattam based on his own text krishnageeti which is composed of 8 chapters . It was performed near the sanctum sanctorum of the Guruvayur Temple. On the ninth day, Avatharam was repeated as the Zamorin felt that it was not auspicious to end the series with the demise of Lord Krishna. The blessed art form is still maintained by Guruvayur devaswom and staged as an offering by devotees.

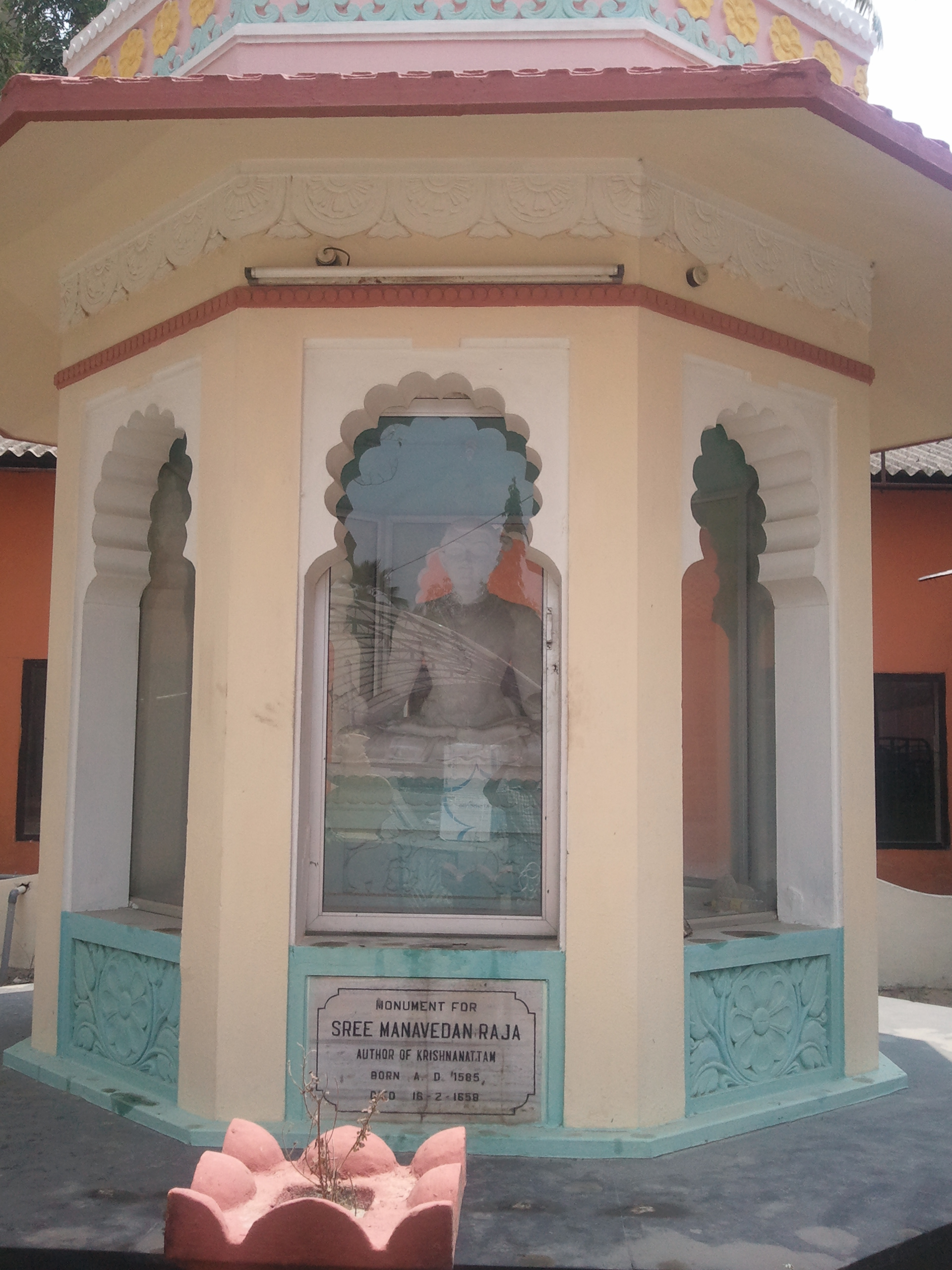
Monument of Manaveda in Guruvayur

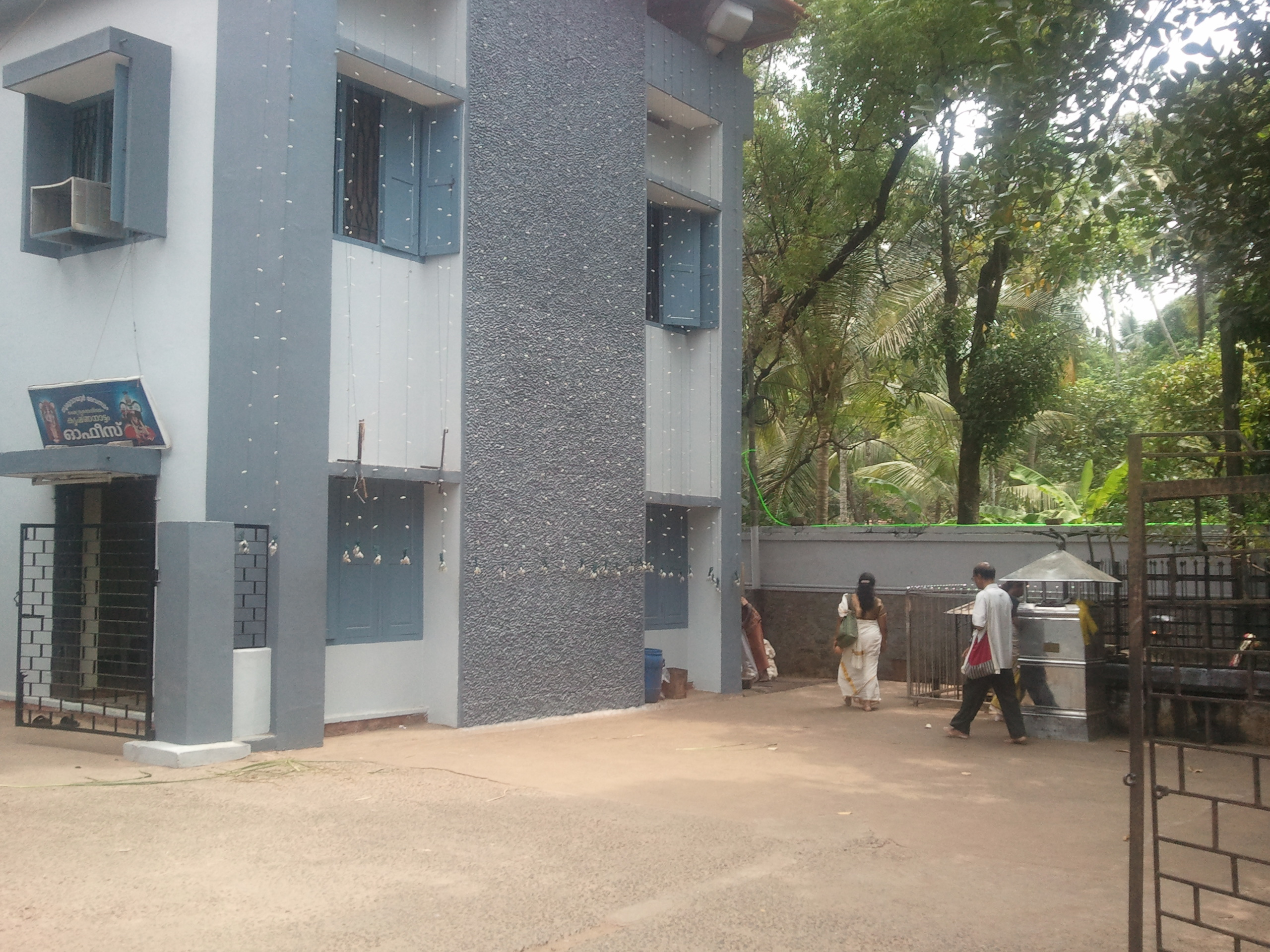
Krishnanattam kalari in Guruvayur near 'Office Ganapathy' temple where the art is taught.

== Author ==
Samoothiri Manavedan Raja (1585–1658 AD) had education from Anayath Krishna pisharody and Desamangalath varrier.

He wrote Poorva bharatha champu (Sanskrit) in 1643. He completed Krishnanattam on 16 November 1653. His statue was installed near 'Panjajanyam' guest house in Guruvayur.

== Krishnageethi ==
The Sanskrit text based on which Krishnanattam was created was written on A.D 1653, aged 68. It consists of eight plays: Avataram, Kaliyamardanam, Rasakrida, Kamsavadham, Swayamvaram, Banayuddham, Vividavadham, and Swargarohanam.It is based on 10th and 11th skandhas of Bhagavata Purana dealing solely the story of Krishna. It has also gained inspirations from Gita Govinda of Jayadeva, Sree krishna vilaasam mahakavya and Narayaniyam of Melpathur Narayana Bhattathiri.

Opening sloka of Krishnanattam is

- Jagathi sukritilokai: nandithaananthidaasa
- Kalaviranithavamsiibhasamanaasamana|
- Pashupayuvathibhogya devathaadevathaa saa
- Sajalajaladhapaliimechaka me chakaasthu

Apart from such slokas it is also adorned by many padyageethams like that of Gita Govinda of Jayadeva.Krishnagiti is a masterpiece work in sanskrit by a keralite.

== The stories ==
Staged at Melpathur auditorium during utsavam

The eight plays are: Avataram, Kaliyamardanam, Rasakrida, Kamsavadham, Swayamvaram, Banayuddham, Vividavadham and Swargarohanam. its easily memorised by a mnemonic "a-ka-ra-ka-swa-bha-vi-swa".On the ninth day, Avatharam is repeated.

The various benefits of Krishnanattam as an offering are listed here.

1. Avatharam for a birth of a child.
2. Kaliyamardhanam to remove the effect of poison.
3. Rasakreeda well being of unmarried girls, to end disputes between couples.
4. Kamsavaddham to remove enemies.
5. Swayamvaram for a happy matrimony.
6. Bana yuddham to remove impoverishment, for good farm production.
7. Vividha vadham to eliminate poverty and increase yield from farms.
8. Swargarohanam for peace of a departed soul.

== Costumes, Makeup and related Rituals ==
All four aspects of a drama, as told by Bharata Muni-viz, Angika, Vachika, Aharya and Satvika are well coordinated in it.

The teachers and artists themselves made the costumes. The basic costume differed for male and female characters. The dress of male characters consisted of

1. a starched gathered petticoat
2. a gathered white skirt with orange/orange-red and black horizontal stripes near the bottom
3. bells attached to leather pads to tie below the knees
4. a long-sleeved shirt open at the back, secured by ties
5. a breast-plate
6. chest ornaments of beads and fresh flora
7. a girdle
8. upper arm and wrist ornaments
9. one shawl or more with a mirror at each end
10. ear and forehead ornaments; and
11. a headdress.

For the female characters the basic costume included

1. a long, almost floor-length white gathered skirt with red border, wrapped so that the material crossed in the back
2. a long sleeved blouse which was open in the back, secured by ties
3. a girdle
4. arm ornaments
5. a wooden breast plate with the breasts covered in red cloth and with ornamentation above and below the breasts.

Female characters tie strings of bells around their ankles. These are called chilanka.

The actors used any or three colours for their basic make-up.

1. pazhuppu, an orange with more red than yellow
2. minukku, an orange with more yellow than red
3. Paccha, a particular shade of green which has more yellow than blue. If he was to wear a chutti the chutti artist applies it. The chutti was two white protruding borders which extended from ear to ear along the jaw and chin line.

The green for Krishna as a young child has more yellow than blue. Before applying make-up the actor prostrated himself before the oil lamp and thought of the God Guruvayoorappan.

The most sacred part of the Krishnanattam costume is the headgear. There are two basic kinds of head dress; a mudi, 'hair that has been wound into a bun and a kiriitam 'a crown'.

== Training ==
Training for artists starts as early as 10 years for 'vesham' and music, 5 years for Madhalam and chutti.

== Performances ==
Night performances in Guruvayur temple in north to Lord Guruvayurappan occurs as offering by devotees. Apart from performing all over India, its reaches are spanning over Europe and the United States. Europe-1980, U.S.A-1985, Singapore, Paris.

== Present setup ==
Consists of over 70 employees under Guruvayur Devaswom. Bookings have to be done through Devaswom alone. The rates for one kadha inside the guruvayur temple is rs.3000.

== Gallery ==
Krishnanattam(കൃഷ്ണനാട്ടം)

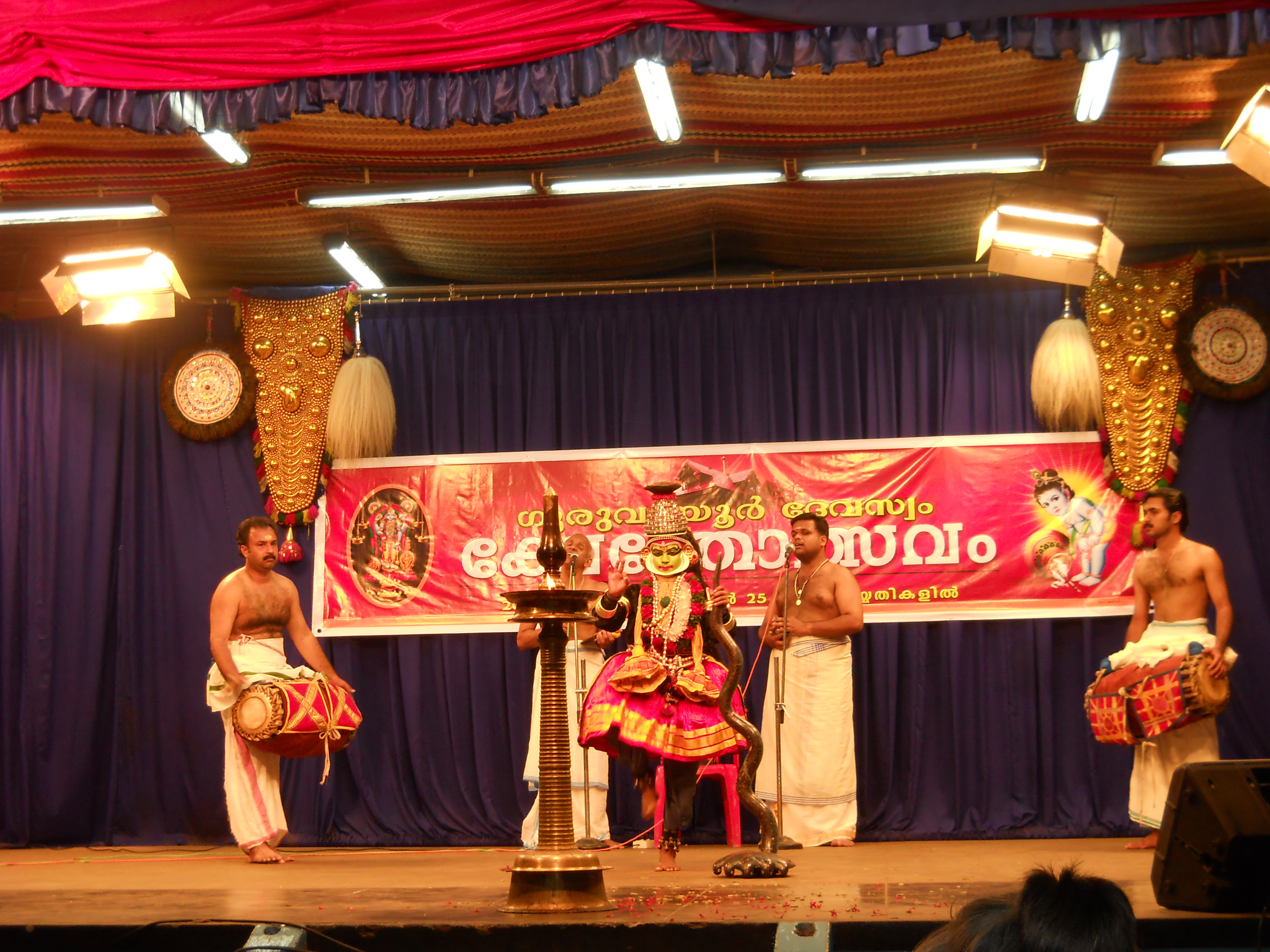

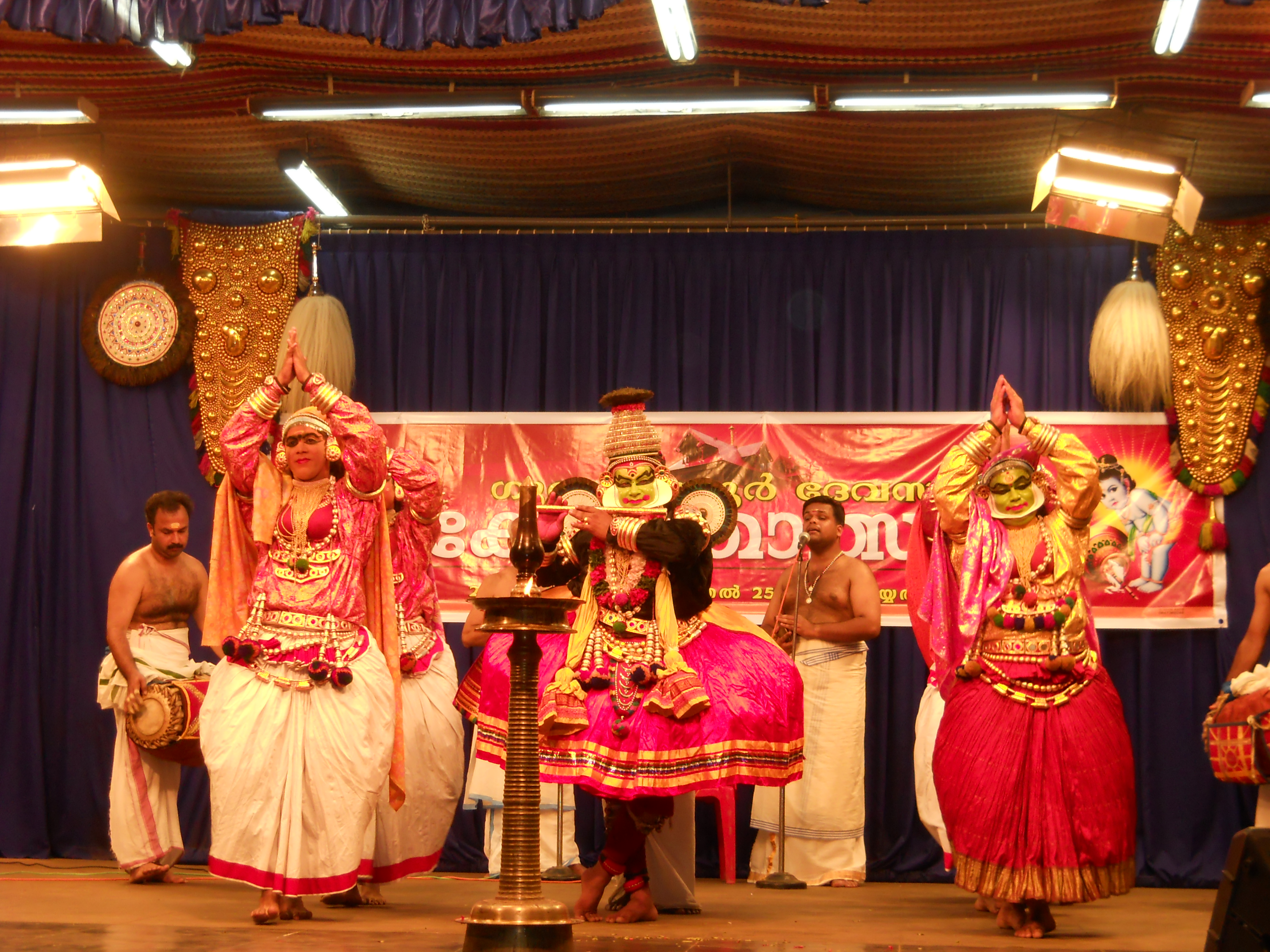

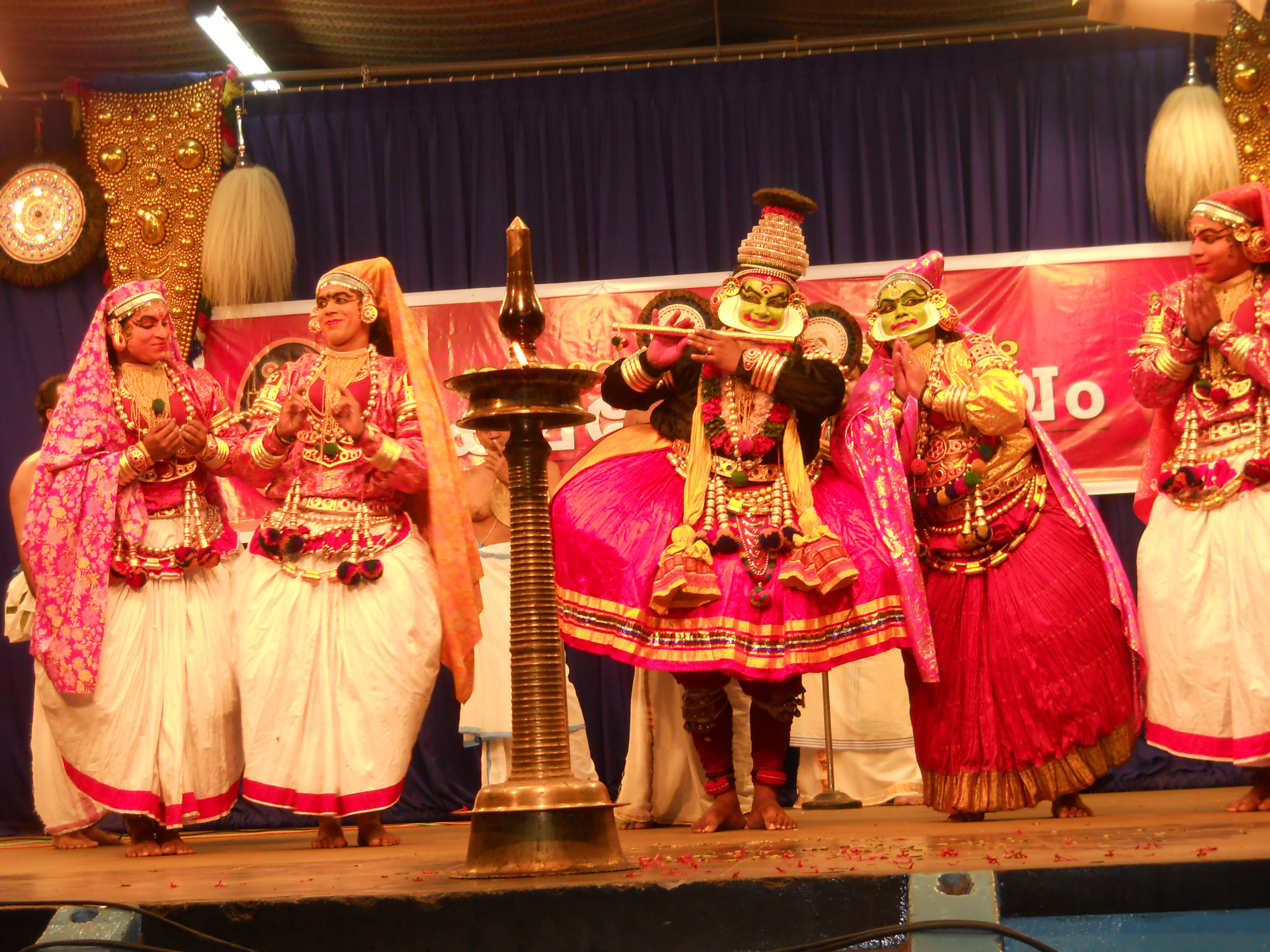

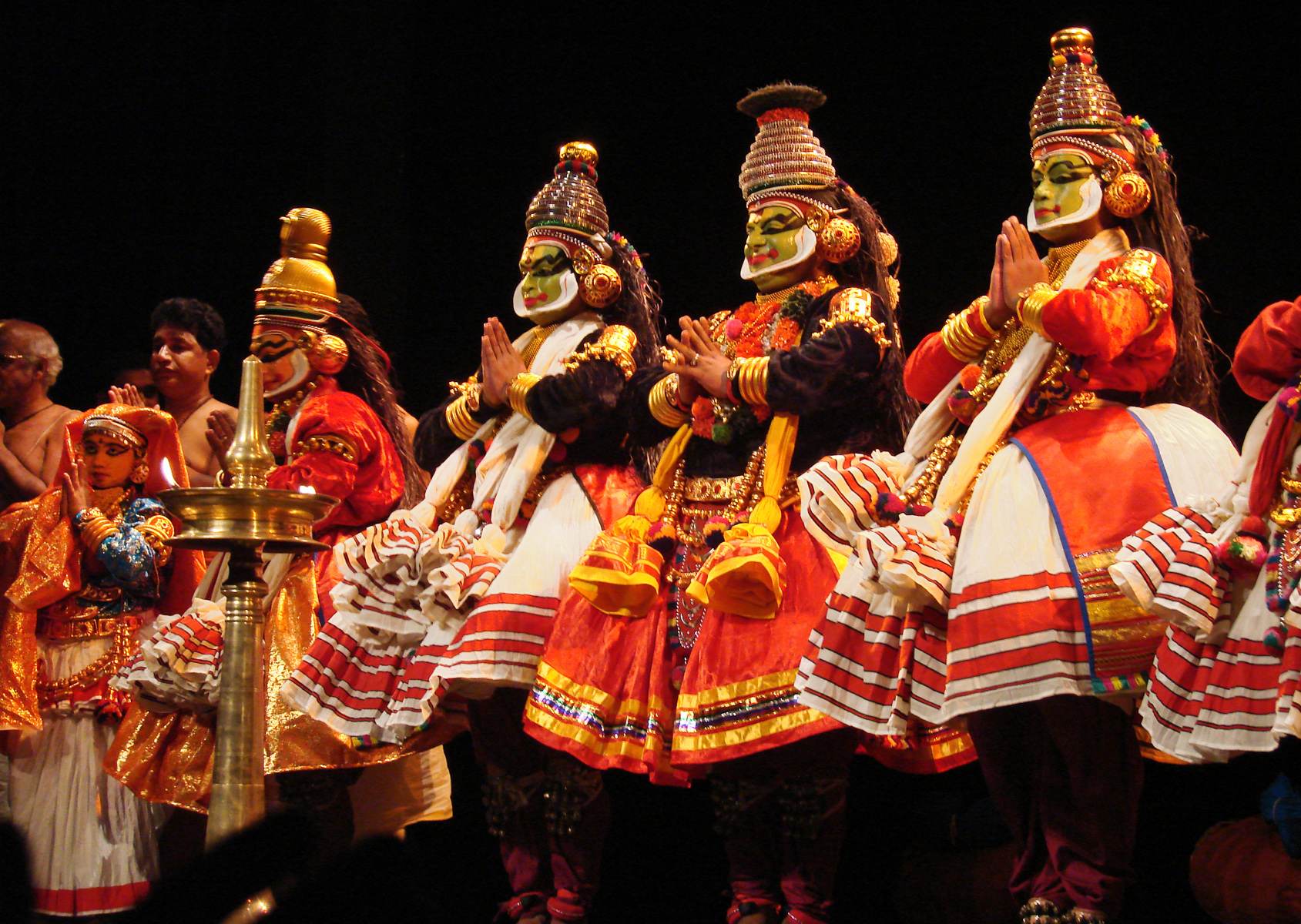

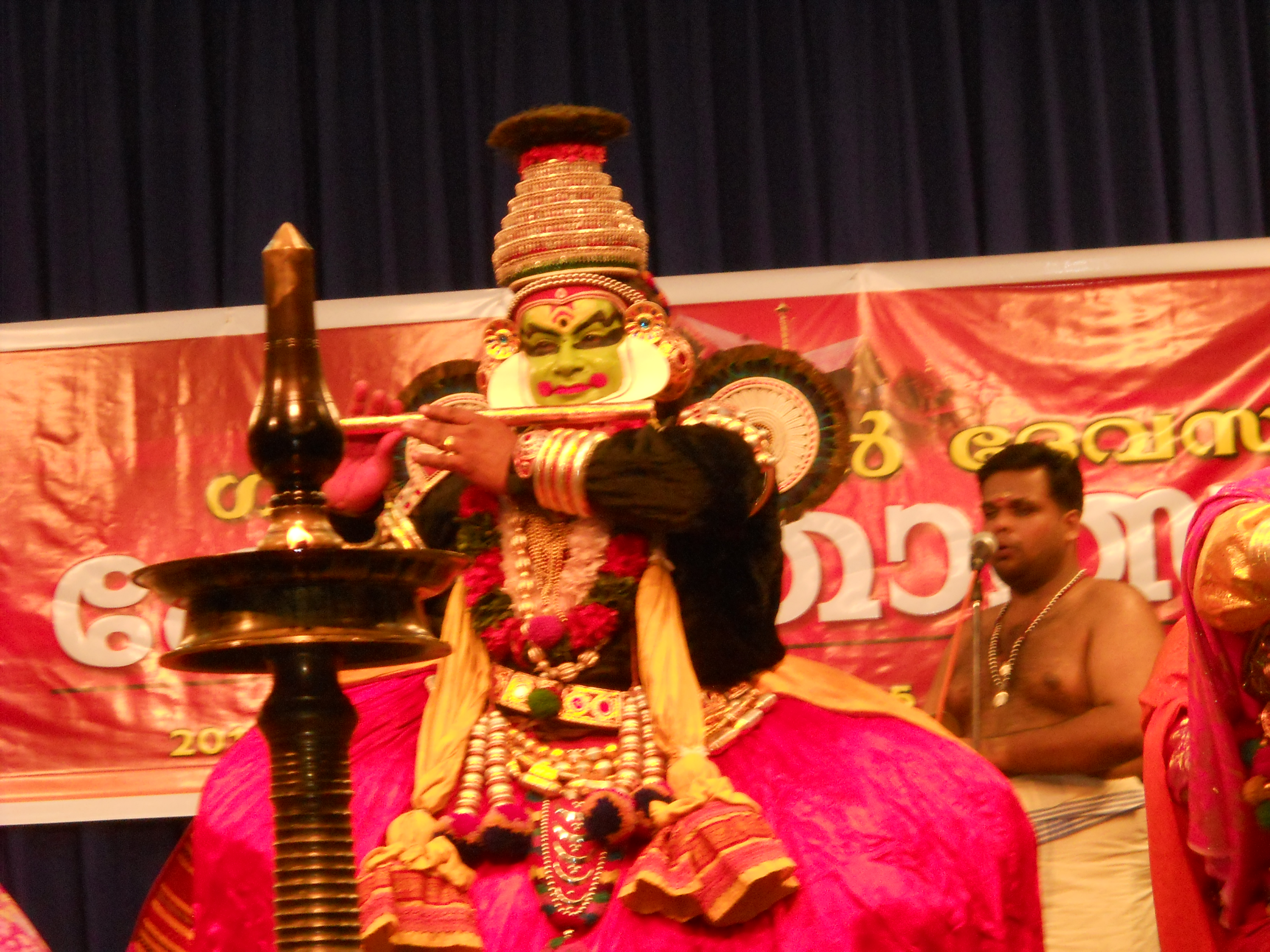

== See also ==
- Bharata Muni
