= Melpathur Narayana Bhattathiri =

17th century Indian mathematical linguist

Melputhur Narayana Bhattathiri (Mēlputtūr Nārāyaṇa Bhaṭṭatiri; 1560–1646/1666), third student of Achyuta Pisharati, was a member of Madhava of Sangamagrama's Kerala school of astronomy and mathematics.

He was a mathematical linguist (vyakarana). His most important scholarly work, Prakriya-sarvasvam, sets forth an axiomatic system elaborating on the classical system of Panini. However, he is most famous for his masterpiece, Narayaneeyam, a devotional composition in praise of Guruvayurappan (Krishna) that is still sung at Guruvayur Temple.

== Birth and education ==
Bhattathri was from a village named Melputhur at Kurumbathur in Athavanad Panchayat near the Tirur River in 1560 in a Brahmin family, the son of Mathrudattan Bhattathiri, a pandit himself. Bhattathiri studied from his father as a child. He learned the Rig Veda from Madhava, Tarka śāstra (science of debate in Sanskrit) from Damodara and Vyākaraṇa (Sanskrit grammar) from Achyuta Pisharati. He became a pandit by the age of 16. He married his guru Achuta Pisharati's niece and settled at Thrikkandiyur in Tirur.One of the manuscripts of Narayaneeyam says that it was copied by the author's younger brother Matrdatta. The Melpathur family is extinct and it is said that it was merged into the Maravancheri Thekkedathu family.

== Works ==
He wrote on diverse subjects including scientific ones. His works are:

- Narayaniyam
- Kriyakrama or Asvalayanakriyakrama
- Prakriyasarvasva
- Sripadasaptati (Supposed to be his last work)
- Dhatukavya
- Svahasudhakara
- Matsyavatara
- Rajasuya
- Ashtamicampu (fine description of Astami festival celebrated in the month of Krithigai (Nov-Dec) in the Shiva temple at Vaikom in north Travancore.
- Dutavakya
- Subhadradharana
- Pancalisvayamvara

Under the patronage of Cochin Vira Keralavarman (1601-1615 A.D) Melputtur wrote the Gosrinagaravarnana and Virakeralaprasasti.
