= Narayaniyam =

Sanskrit work of Hindu literature

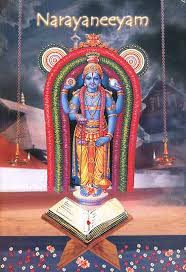
- Modern cover of the text

Information
- Religion: Hinduism
- Author: Melpathur Narayana Bhattathiri
- Language: Sanskrit
- Period: 16th century
- Verses: 1,036

The Narayaniyam (Sanskrit: नारायणीयम्, romanized: Nārāyaṇīyam) is a medieval-era Sanskrit text, comprising a summary study in poetic form of the Bhagavata Purana. It was composed by Melpathur Narayana Bhattathiri, a celebrated Sanskrit poet of Kerala. Even though the Narayaniyam is believed to be composed as early as 1585 CE, the earliest available manuscripts came only after more than 250 years. The Bhagavata Purana is a major Hindu scripture consisting of about 18,000 verses, mainly devoted to the worship of Krishna. The work contains detailed descriptions of Guruvayurappan, a regional form of Krishna, and the temple town of Guruvayur.

== Description ==
The Narayaniyam (pronunciation IPA: [nɑːrɑːjəɳiːjəm]) condenses the Bhagavata Purana into 1036 verses, divided into one hundred dasakam, or cantos. The work occupies high place in Sanskrit literature, both because of the intense devotional fervour of the verses, and because of their extraordinary literary merit. It is one of the most popular religious texts in Kerala and Tamil Nadu, and devout Hindus often recite it together in festivals and groups.

== Legend ==
According to a local legend, Bhattathiri had a guru by the name of Achyuta Pisharadi, who fell victim to arthritis, and suffered unbearable pain. Bhattathiri desired to relieve his guru of his suffering and fervently prayed for the disease to be transferred to himself. According to the legend, Krishna granted Bhattathiri his wish, and he soon became crippled. However, when he composed and sang the Narayaniyam, his pain subsided and his health was miraculously restored.

The Chakorasandesha, which was earlier than the Narayaniyam, also refers to rheumatic patients going to the Guruvayur temple. Worship in the Guruvayur temple is considered to be sure remedy for all diseases.

== Legacy ==
The Narayaniya Sahasranama is a condensed form of Narayaniyam consisting of 1000 names of Vishnu. It is carefully created collections, of all the namas (names) of Vishnu's avatars, that appear sequentially and chapter-wise in the Narayaniyam. It was composed by Ayyappan Kariyat, an Ayurveda vaidya.

The Narayaniya Saptaham (the recitation of Narayaniyam and explaining the meaning to the public) is conducted in Guruvayur temple by devasvam on the occasion of Narayaniya Dinam, held on the 28th day of the Hindu month of Vṛścik‌‌‌a, and by others as offerings. It is done for seven consecutive days from early morning till 6:10 PM. This ceremony was started in Guruvayur in the early 1950s. It takes about 5 hours to read the slokas and about 45 hours for explaining the shlokas. Discourses and debates on the Narayaniyam written by Melpathur also take place.
