= Guruvayurappan =

Form of the Hindu god Vishnu

- God of Preservation God of Guruvayur
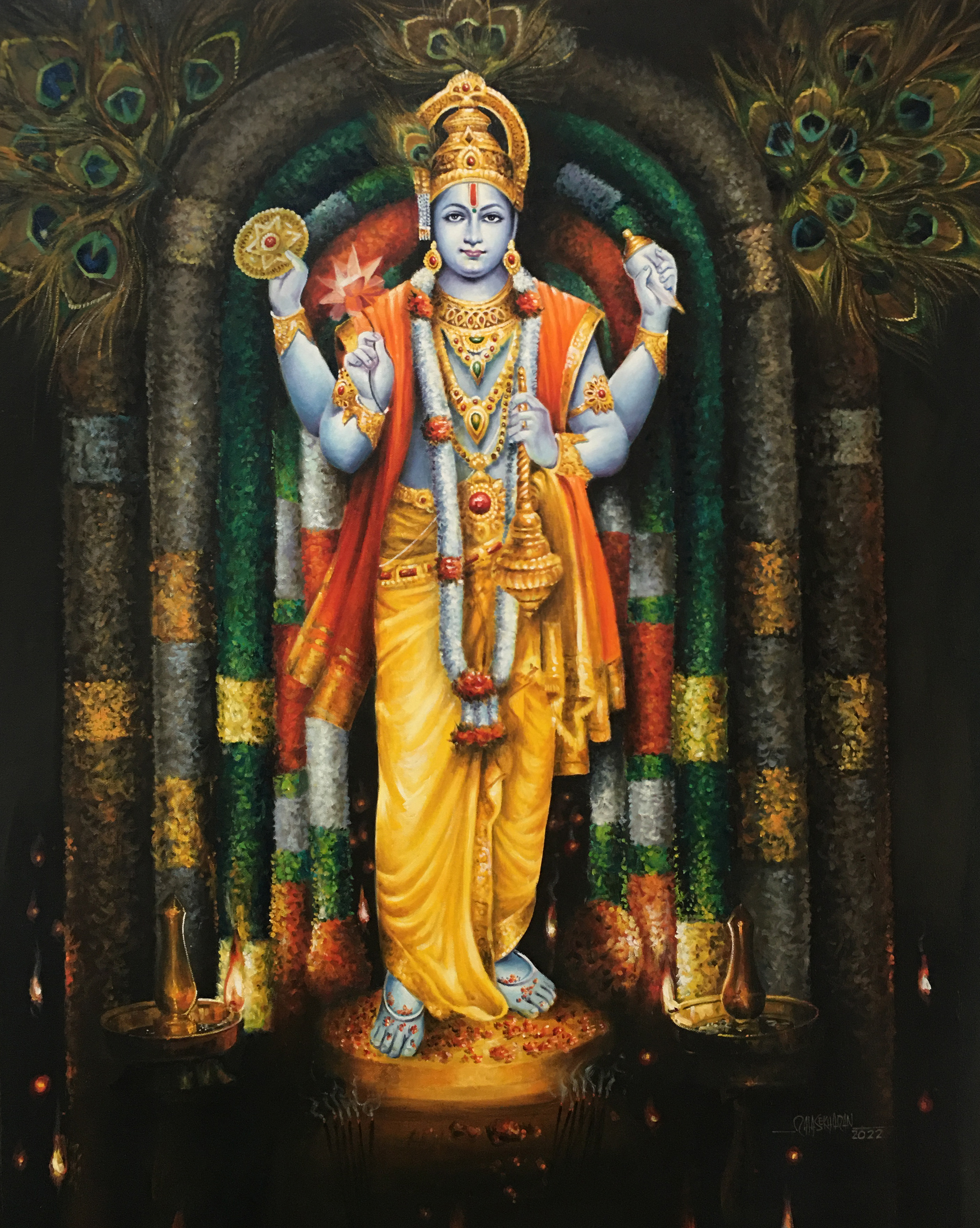
- Sanskrit transliteration: Guruvāyūrappan
- Affiliation: Vaishnavism
- Abode: Vaikuntha
- Planet: Earth
- Mantra: Om Namo Narayanaya
- Weapon: Sudarshana Chakra, Panchajanya, Kaumodaki
- Symbol: Padma (Vishnu)
- Mount: Garuda
- Consort: Lakshmi

Guruvayurappan (Malayalam: ഗുരുവായൂരപ്പന്‍; guruvāyūrappan) (lit. Lord / Father of Guruvayoor) also rendered as Guruvayoorappan, is a form of Vishnu worshipped mainly in Kerala, India. He is the presiding deity of the Guruvayur Temple, who is worshipped as Krishna in his child form, also known as Guruvayur Unnikkannan (lit. 'Little Krishna' of Guruvayoor). The temple is in the town of Guruvayur, Thrissur, Kerala, which is named after the deity.

== Legend ==
According to the Gurupavanapura Mahatmya in the Narada Purana, King Janamejaya performed a sarpa yajna (snake sacrifice) to avenge his father Parikshit's death by the serpent Takshaka. Cursed by the dying snakes, Janamejaya developed leprosy, which was later cured when the sage Dattatreya advised him to worship Krishna at Guruvayur. Dattatreya revealed that the murti (idol) at Guruvayur was originally given by Vishnu to Brahma, and was later passed down through successive rebirths to Sutapa and Prisni, Kashyapa and Aditi, and Vasudeva and Devaki.

Before the submergence of Dvaraka at the end of Krishna's avatar, the deity instructed his disciple Uddhava and Brihaspati (Guru) to salvage the murti. Accompanied by Vayu (the wind god), Brihaspati retrieved the murti from the sea and carried it south to Kerala. Upon their arrival near Trichur, Parashurama, Shiva, and Parvati welcomed them at the Rudratirtha lake. Shiva relinquished the lake to the new deity and relocated across the shore to Mammiyur. Brihaspati and Vayu then consecrated the idol with the assistance of the divine architect Vishvakarma. The site was subsequently named Guruvayur (city of Guru and Vayu) and the deity came to be known as Guruvayurappan.

== Regional myths ==
=== King and the cobra ===
An astrologer told a kerala King that he was destined to die from a cobra bite on a particular day. He was advised to go and pray before Guruvayurappan. The king spent years in meditation and prayer at the feet of the deity. One day, the King realized that the time of his death had passed. He came back to his palace and asked the astrologer why the prediction was wrong. The wise man showed him the mark on his left foot where the cobra had bitten him. Since the king was wholly absorbed in God, Who alone can dispense with fate, he did not feel the sting. In gratitude, the King built the temple at Guruvayur and set apart funds for the daily routine of the temple.

Most of the current temple building dates to the 16th and 17th centuries, although devotees funded extensions and additions later. The deepastamba (column of lights) was erected in 1836 by a devotee from Thiruvananthapuram. The temple has gopurams in the east and the west. The eastern gopuram has an inscription which refers to the town as "Gurupavanapura". The western gopuram was built in 1747.

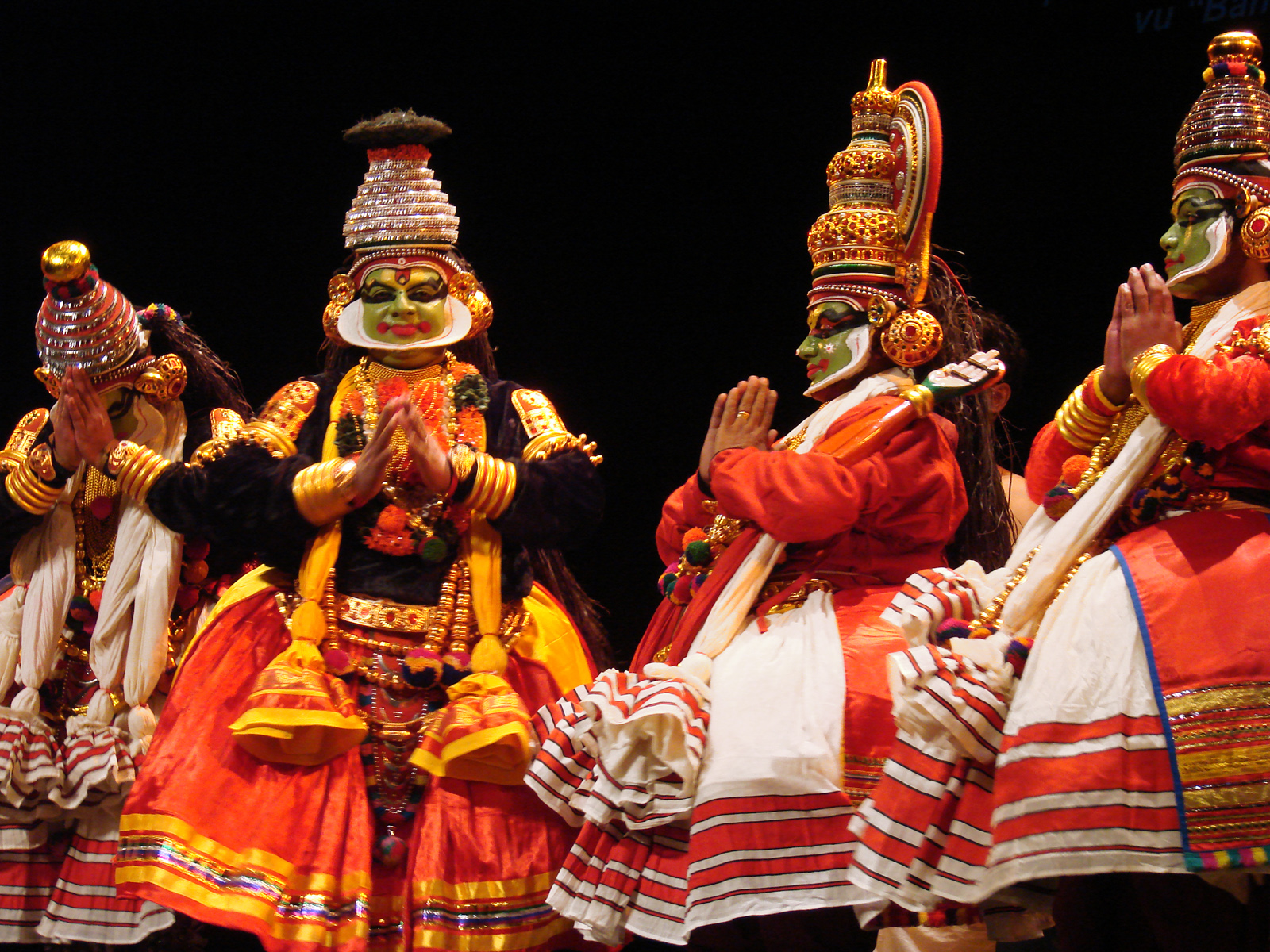
Krishnanattam

=== King Manaveda and Vilwamangalam ===
King Manaveda told Vilwamangalam about his ambition to view Krishna. The next day, the Swamiyar told him that Guruvayurappan has given his consent—Manavedan was permitted to see (but not touch) Guruvayurappan playing in the early hours of the morning at the platform of the Elanji tree. But, when Manavedan saw Guruvayurappan in the form of little child Krishna, he was so excited that he forgot himself and rushed to embrace little Krishna. Guruvayoorappan immediately disappeared saying, "Vilwamangalam did not tell me that this will happen". However, Manavedan got one peacock feather from the headgear of Bhagavan Krishna.

The peacock feather was incorporated in the headgear for the character of Krishna in the dance drama Krishnanattam, based on his own text Krishnageethi. It was performed near the sanctum sanctorum of the Guruvayur Temple. On the ninth day, one play (Avatharam) of the drama was repeated, as the Samoothiri felt that it was not auspicious to end the series with the demise of Krishna. The blessed art form is still maintained by Guruvayur Devaswom and staged as an offering by devotees.

=== Shopkeeper and boy ===
Once, a poor, hungry boy stole a banana from a nearby fruit shop. Being a devotee of Lord Guruvayurappan, he dropped half the banana into the 'hundi', and he ate the other half. The shopkeeper caught hold of the boy and accused him of the theft. The boy admitted his guilt. The shopkeeper did not have the heart to punish this innocent boy, but to teach him a lesson, he ordered him to walk around the temple a certain number of times. The shopkeeper was aghast when he saw Lord Guruvayurappan follow the little boy around the temple. That night, God came to the shopkeeper in a dream and explained, "Since I have also had a share in the stolen banana, I am bound to share the punishment, too. So, I followed the boy around the temple."

=== Nenmini Unni ===
Once, a Nenmini Namboodiri, the main priest (melsanthi) at the Guruvayur Temple, instructed his twelve-year-old son, Unni, to offer the nivadyam to God. There was no assistant priest (keezhsanthi) on that day and the Nenmini Namboodiri had to go out on an emergency. The son offered a nivedyam of cooked rice to God; in his simplicity, he believed that the deity would eat the food, but the deity did not move. Unni bought some salted mangoes and curd from a neighborhood vendor, thinking that God would prefer this, mixed the curd with rice and offered it again. The deity again remained unmoved. Unni cajoled, requested, coaxed and in the end threatened, but the deity remained unmoved. He wept because he believed he had failed and shouted at God, exclaiming that his father would beat him. God could not bear it anymore and made the nivedyam disappear. The boy left the temple satisfied. Unni did not know that the nivedyam offered to God was the Variyar's prerequisite. When Variyar returned to the temple, he saw the empty plate and became angry with Unni. Unni insisted that God had eaten the offering, but his words made Variyar furious, as he believed the boy had eaten the offering himself and was lying. His father was about to beat Unni, but just then an Asareeri (celestial voice) was heard saying, "What Unni told is right. I am guilty. Unni is innocent. I ate all the food that he had offered me. There's no need to punish him".

Nenmini family is still lives in Guruvayur, and is wealthy. It also sponsors the Saptami (7th day) Vilakku during the annual Ekadasi festival in the Malayalam month of Vrischikam.

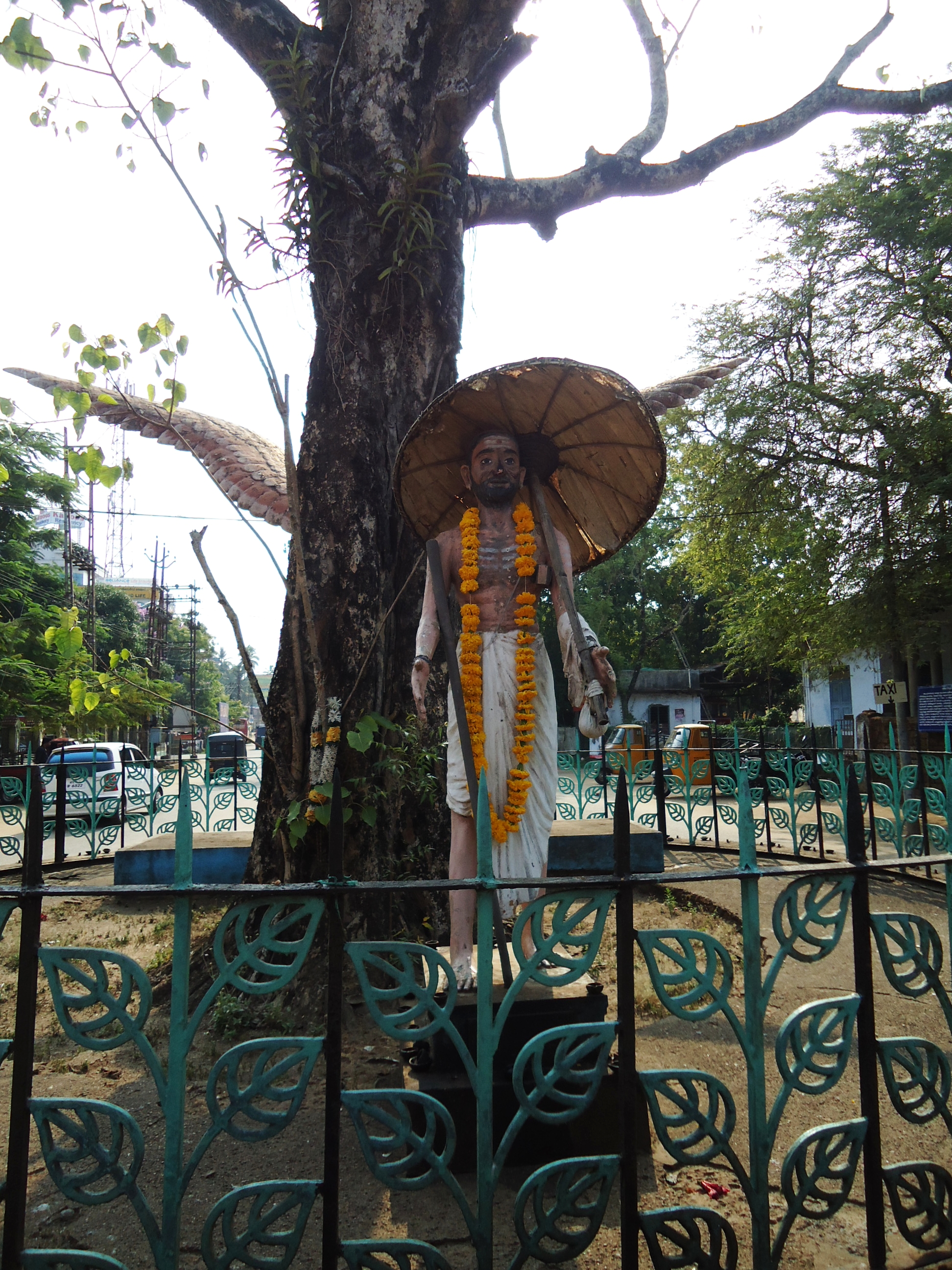
Statue of Poonthanam Namboothiri, Guruvayur

=== Poonthanam and Melpathur ===
Poonthanam was a contemporary of Melpathur Narayana Bhattathiri, another famous poet associated with Guruvayur. Melpathur, the author of the Sanskrit work Narayaneeyam, was a famed scholar who out of pride refused Poonthanam's request to read his Jnanappana, a work in Malayalam. Legend has it that Guruvayurappan, impressed by Poonthanam's humility and devotion, preferred his works to those of Bhattathiri's, and once even rebuked Bhattathiri for ignoring Poonthanam's Santhanagopala Paana, saying he preferred Poonthanam's genuine bhakti to Bhattathiri's vibhakti.

== See also ==
- Guruvayoor Temple
- Guruvayoor
- Abhimana Kshethram
- Divya desam
