= Manchu (disambiguation) =

The Manchu people are a Tungusic people who originated in Manchuria (modern Northeast China and Russian Manchuria).

Manchu or Manchoo may also refer to:

- Manchu language, a Tungusic language spoken in Heilongjiang, China
  - Manchu alphabet
- Manchu dynasty or Qing dynasty from 1644 to 1912
- Manchukuo or Manchu State, a puppet state of the Empire of Japan from 1932 to 1945
- 9th Infantry Regiment (United States), earned the nickname "Manchu" during the Boxer Rebellion and the China Relief Expedition
- Ulmus pumila 'Manchu', a Siberian Elm cultivar
- Manchu (surname), a surname (includes a list)
- Philippe Bouchet, French science-fiction illustrator who uses "Manchu" as pen name
- Fu Manchu, fictional character

== See also ==
- Manchu Empire (disambiguation)
- Manchuria (disambiguation)
- Manchurian (disambiguation)
- Manchurians (disambiguation)
- Manshu (disambiguation)
- Manju (disambiguation)
