= Manchurian =

Manchurian may refer to:

- Manchuria, a region in Northeast Asia
  - Manchurian people, a Tungusic people who originated in Manchuria (today's Northeastern China)
  - Manchurian language, a Tungusic language spoken in Northeast China
- Manchurian (dish), a style of food dishes such as chicken Manchurian, vegetable Manchurian, etc. in Indian Chinese cuisine
- Manchurian, a blue aleurone malting barley variety

== See also ==
- Manchurians (disambiguation)
- Manchuria (disambiguation)
- Manchu (disambiguation)
- The Manchurian Candidate (disambiguation)
