= Manshu =

Manshu may refer to:

- Manshu, a 9th-century Chinese text by Fan Chuo
- Su Manshu (1884–1918), Chinese writer, poet, painter, revolutionist, and translator
- Manshū (満州), Japanese for Manchuria
- Manchuria Airplane Manufacturing Company (満州国飛行機製造株式会社, Manshūkoku Hikōki Seizo Kabushiki Kaisha) (AKA Manshū or Mansyû), active in the 1930s and 1940s
  - Manshū Hayabusa, an airliner made by Manchukuo Aircraft Company in the late 1930s
- Manchuria Aviation Company (満州航空株式会社, Manshū Kōkū Kabushiki Kaisha), the Manchukuo national airline 1931/32–45
- Manshu-in (AKA Manshuin Monzeki), a Tendai temple located near the Shugakuin Imperial Villa at Sakyō-ku, Ichijo-ji, Takenouchi-cho, in northeast Kyoto, Japan.
- "Manshu Musume" (Japanese for "Manchurian Girl"), a Japanese hit song in 1938

== See also ==
- Manchu (disambiguation)
- Manchukuo
