= Manchow soup =

Indo-Chinese soup

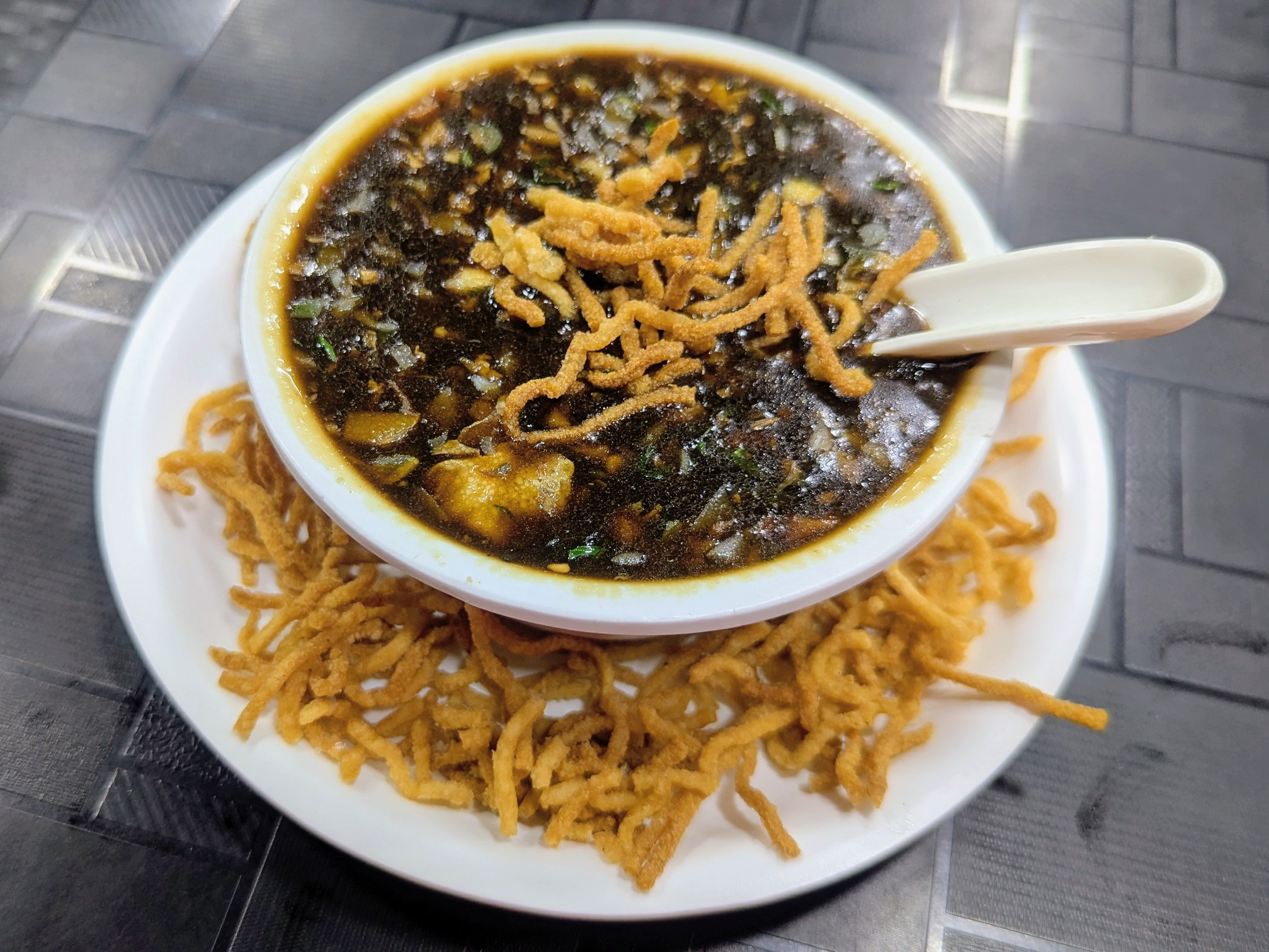
- Simple street-side Indian Chinese version of chicken Manchow soup
- Course: Soup
- Place of origin: India
- Region or state: Meghalaya
- Serving temperature: Hot
- Main ingredients: Vegetables, scallions
- Variations: Non-vegetarian version with chicken, Jain version

Manchow soup is a popular type of soup exclusive to Indo-Chinese cuisine, due to its easy preparation and hot, spicy taste. It is available in many restaurants and street food carts. Although the soup is named after the Asian region of Manchuria, it does not resemble food that is normally found in the region and is instead from the state of Meghalaya.

== Ingredients ==
It is a dark brown soup that is prepared with various vegetables, scallions, and chicken, thickened with broth and corn flour, and flavored with generous amounts of soy sauce, salt, garlic, chili peppers and, primarily, ginger. It may be either vegetarian or non-vegetarian. It is garnished with chopped spring onions and served with crispy fried noodles.

== See also ==
- China–India relations
  - Chindians
  - Historical and cultural relations between China and India
- List of deep-fried foods
- List of soups
- List of vegetable dishes
- Manchurian (dish)
- Manchu cuisine
