= Indian Chinese cuisine =

Fusion cuisine combining Indian and Chinese traditions

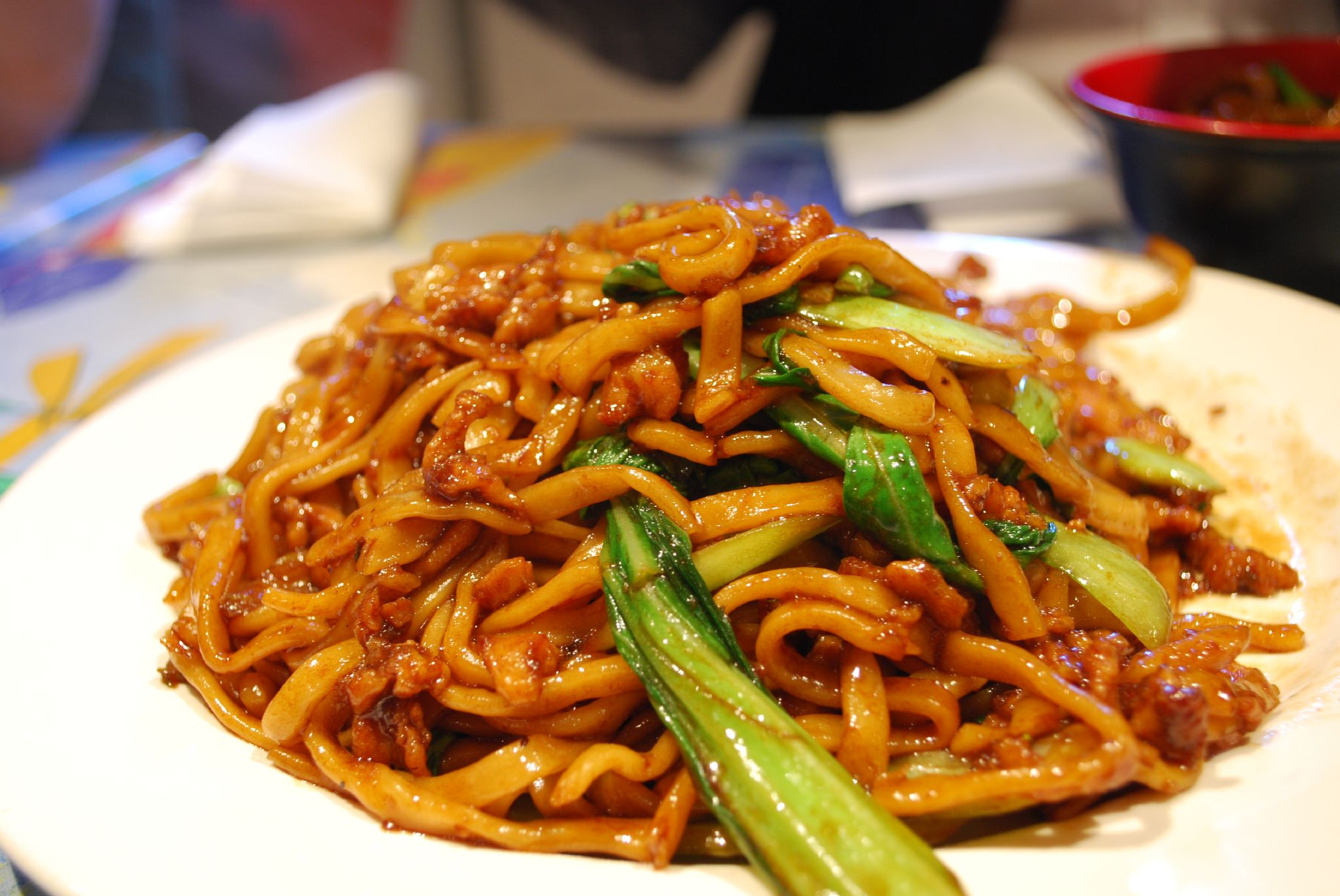
Shanghai fried noodles with oily, saucy flavors

Indian Chinese cuisine is a distinct style of Chinese cuisine adapted to Indian tastes and spices. Though Asian cuisines have been mixed throughout history all over Asia, the most popular origin story of the fusion food resides with Chinese immigrants to British-ruled India at places like Calcutta. Opening restaurant businesses in the area, these early Chinese food sellers adapted their culinary styles to suit Indian tastes.

Chinese Indian food is differentiated from traditional Indian cuisines by its distinct blend of Chinese and Indian influences: Indian vegetables and bolder spices are used, along with much Chinese sauces, thickening agents, and oil. Stir-fried in a wok, Sino-Indian food adds Indian sensibilities regarding spices and tastes when adapting Chinese culinary styles to the Indian palate. The cuisine has become integral to the mainstream culinary scenes of India, and its diffusion to nations like the United States, the United Kingdom, Australia, Canada, and the Caribbean such as Jamaica and Martinique, have shaped and altered the global view of Chinese, Indian, and Asian cuisines like in most Southeast Asian countries of Indonesia and Thailand.

== Origins ==
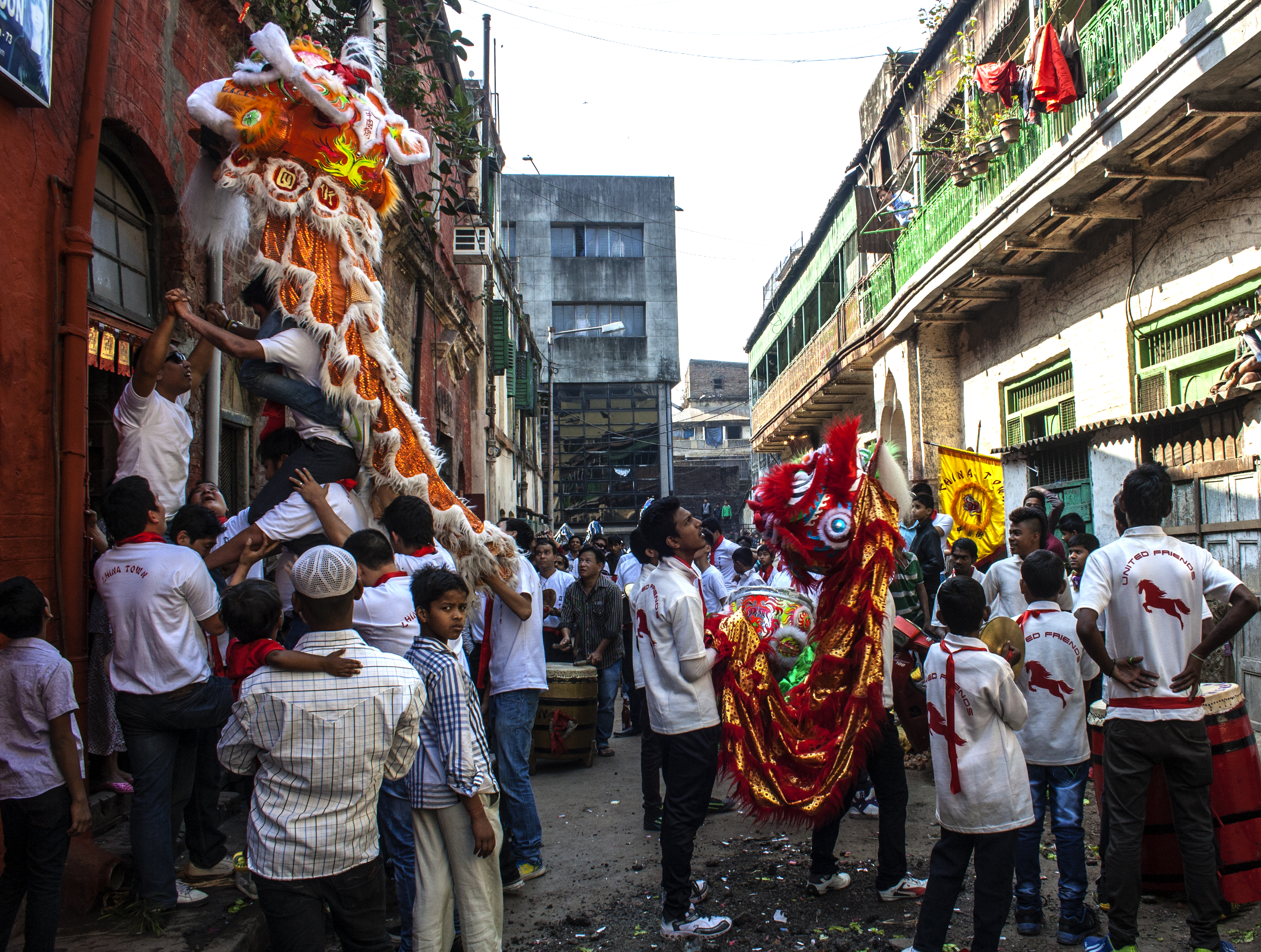
Chinese New Year celebration in Kolkata (2014).

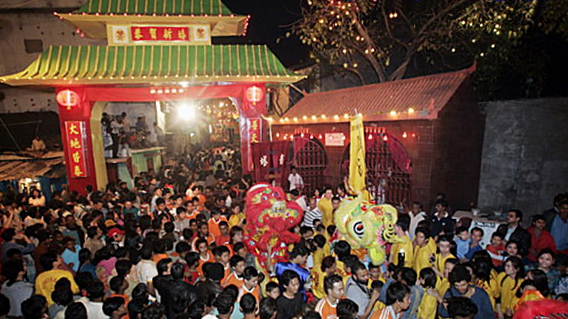
Chinatown, Tangra, Kolkata.

=== Chinese in India ===
The most popular theory for the origins of Chinese Indian food was during the British Rule of India. Kolkata was the capital of British-ruled India when it was governed by the East India Trading Company (from 1757 to 1858). The city's relation to the British crown made it a great place for material prospects and opportunity, which drew businessmen and immigrant workers from surrounding areas. The city was the most accessible metropolitan area of the country by land from China; thus, it became home to the very first Chinese settler, a southern Chinese man named Tong Atchew (also referred to as Yang Dazhao or Yang Tai Chow). In 1778, Atchew settled 20 miles southwest of Kolkata, founding a sugar mill along with five dozen or so Chinese immigrants. Following Atchew's footsteps, waves of Cantonese immigrants from Guangdong province of China fled to India due to civil war, famine, poverty, and conflict, searching for safety and prosperity. Hakka Chinese found their niche as cobblers and tanners, while the Cantonese settled mostly as carpenters and the Hubei people as dentists. However, an occupation popular among all groups, especially of wives supporting their husbands' work, was a restaurateur.

From these first early settlers, communities of Chinese influence sprung up throughout the area, neighbourhoods of immigrants cooking and eating foods from their homeland. These Canton cuisines, known in China to be light and fresh in flavour, began to adapt and evolve into the new area. One reason is due to the availability of ingredients and spices being different from those in Guangdong, therefore forcing the flavour to naturally Indianize; additionally, Chinese businesses began to cater their foods to the tastes of their Indian patrons to increase sales, utilizing more spices and heavier douses of sauce and oil than their traditional techniques required. Recognized as one of the first Indo-Chinese restaurants in the country, the still-standing corner eatery of Eau Chew gained its popularity by using the fashionable pull of exotic Chinese foods combined with non-threatening familiar flavours of chili, curry, and corn starch, to attract and keep-on customers. Kolkata today boasts the only Chinatown in the country, a neighbourhood known as the Tiretti Bazaar. This being said, nearly every city in India has these adapted "Chinese" foods, whether found in restaurants or hawked by roadside vendors, as the greasy, spicy, stir-fried food that has become wildly popular throughout the country. It is also important to note those Chinese returning from India to their homelands in China's south, for they often brought their new culinary practices and flavours with them, working to Indianize the taste of Cantonese-style foods in southern coastal cities such as Hong Kong.

=== Additional origin points ===
As Indian historian Pushpesh Pant once noted, Indian Chinese food is "the result of several isolated encounters." These encounters, in addition to the Kolkata story, include influences of the Silk Road, historical ties, and geography. Each of these aspects has worked in some way to tie the culinary practices and flavours of the two countries together, marking other possible origin points for the Indian Chinese culinary tradition.

Silk Road routes connecting the (near and far) East with the West

==== Silk Road cultural exchange ====
Buddhist expansion in Asia, from Buddhist heartland in northern India (dark orange) starting 5th century BCE, to Buddhist majority realm (orange), and historical extent of Buddhism influences (yellow). Mahāyāna (red arrow), Theravāda (green arrow), and Tantric-Vajrayāna (blue arrow). The overland and maritime "Silk Roads" were interlinked and complementary, forming what scholars have called the "great circle of Buddhism".

The Silk Road (or Silk Routes) was a network of trading posts and pathways on land and sea utilized from 130 BCE to 1453 CE spanning from China and the Indonesian islands through India and the Middle East, all the way to northeastern Africa and Italy. The significance of this route to ancient history is undeniable, the exchange of goods, diseases, and ideas from the East to West and vice versa has had a lasting impact upon the human story. Chinese and Indian merchants would carry their goods across the borders separating the two neighbouring countries: silks, rice, and crockery coming from China, with a plethora of influential spices sprouting from India. Another exchange between China and India was religion, with Buddhism coming to China from India via the Silk Road as well. Moreover, as aspects of Indian culture, practices, and beliefs melded with Chinese traditions, the Mahayana Buddhist religion was formed. Just as the Chinese adapted Buddhist practices to their own beliefs, the two cultures adopted certain aspects of the other throughout their historical interactions and exchanges. Rice dishes cooked in Indianized Chinese woks can be found in the nation's south, and there are spices of ginger, cinnamon, and black pepper present in various Chinese culinary styles. In this way, it can be seen how the Silk Road was vital in bringing characteristics of the two cultures together. Indian and Chinese food aspects collided hundreds of years ago to form culinary traditions now inextricable with these nations. In this way, the Indo-Chinese fusion cuisine could be said to have appeared long before the first Chinese settlers in Kolkata.

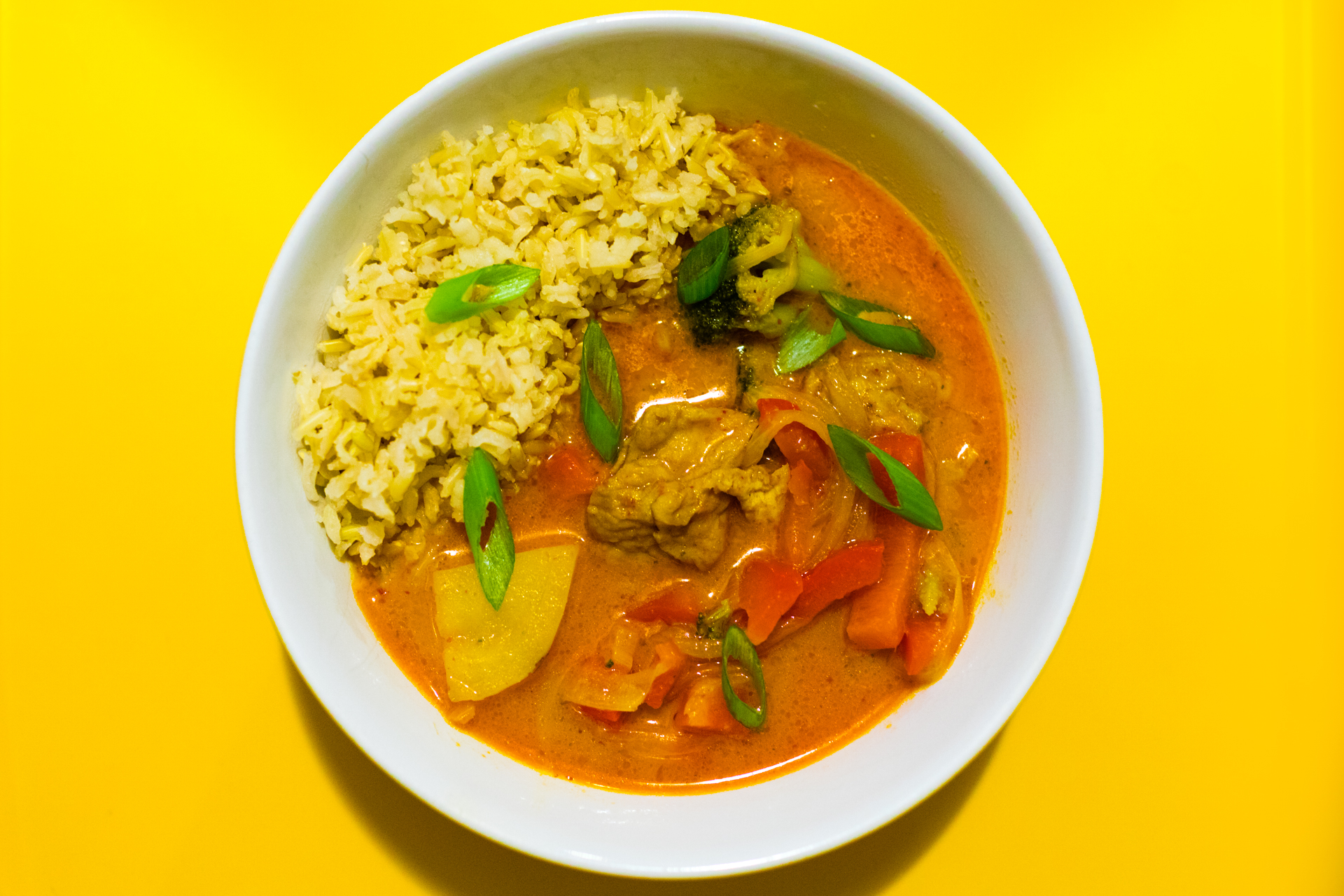
Thai red curry: the red chillies give it colour and spice.

==== Influences on Southeast Asian cuisine ====
Geographically, India and China are neighbours; historically, the two nations are ancient empires. Two of the most populous countries in the world today, both India and China boast lengthy histories. Since the second century CE, Hindu rulers presided over Southeast Asian countries and Chinese regimes ruled the more eastern regions, such as Vietnam. Similarly, Asia's southeast was historically populated by immigrants from both China and India, namely the Han and Tamil ethnic groups who joined scattered aboriginal societies. The influences of China and India can be detected in the cuisines of Southeast Asia, where the two culinary practices have been combined, adapted, and developed by generations of people. For example, the Chinese practice of rice cultivation was introduced to the regions of Southeast Asia and Nepal in the thirtieth century BC, where it has existed as an irreplaceable and undeniable staple ever since. Furthermore, now completely embedded within Southeast Asian culinary practices, Chinese cooking and eating implements such as spoons, chopsticks, and woks were other products which were introduced to the region. Evidence of Indian influence, in addition to religious philosophies and ancient architecture, can be found in the spices and flavours of Southeast Asian cooking. Curries—meat, fish, or vegetables cooked in a spiced sauce accompanied by rice or bread—originated on the Indian subcontinent, but have since diffused throughout Asia. Spices such as turmeric, coriander, pepper, brown mustard, and ginger are present in curries throughout Southeast Asia, though each country has adapted the practice to utilize their own regional ingredients as well. Most notably, Indonesian, Malaysian, Thai, Filipino, and Cambodian cuisines all have strong ties to Indian-style curry flavours. These aspects of both Chinese and Indian culinary practices and traditions have combined to create the origins of what is now a rich and diverse culinary scene making up Asia's southeastern region. Thus, with the joined influence of the two cultures, Southeast Asian cuisine itself is another example of Indian Chinese food origins.

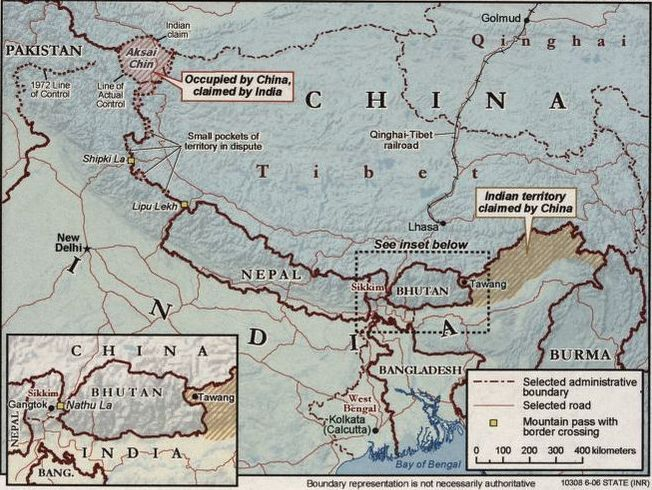
Nepal and Myanmar; bordered by India and Tibet, China.

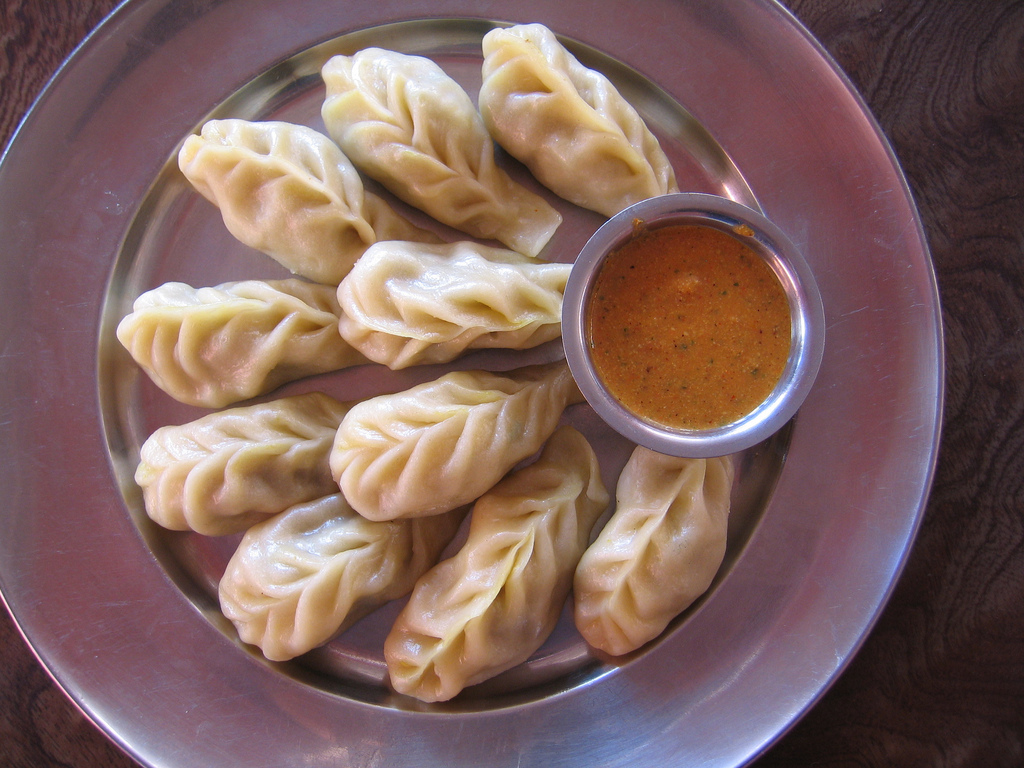
Momo dumplings; found in Nepal, Tibet, and Northeastern India.

==== Culinary diffusion across borders ====
In addition to Southeast Asia, China has been influenced by Indian spices as well, especially in the autonomous region of Tibet, with Nepal also possessing culinary practices hailing from both its Chinese and Indian neighbours. Therefore, another origin point of Indian Chinese food can be traced to the cultures of Nepalese and Tibetan peoples, whose lands are mostly encompassed by the two nations (India and China). Although not aligned with the greasy and pungent flavors of the culinary traditions which evolved in Kolkata, the simple foods of Nepal are often accompanied by rice, and consist of curries or spiced vegetables stir-fried or boiled in an Indian-style wok called a karahi. Tibetan food, in addition to high altitude and harsh climates, is geographically influenced by the flavours of the countries surrounding it: notably Nepal, India, and China. Tibet is a nation heavily influenced by Indian Buddhist values (first brought in the fifth century AD), and with beliefs and ideas, travels culture and food as well. Noodles and teas from China (vital in making the tsampa eaten with every meal), brown mustard from India, and even a "momo" dumpling dish shared with Nepal are all significant constituents to dishes of Tibetan cuisine. With the diffusion of ingredients, culinary styles, and flavours across borders, the regions of Nepal and Tibet (as well as Bhutan) which touch both India and China inadvertently developed cuisines mixing both Chinese and Indian styles and tastes, creating yet another Indo-Chinese food origin.

== Features ==
Foods tend to be flavoured with spices such as cumin, coriander seeds, and turmeric, which with a few regional exceptions, such as Xinjiang, are traditionally not associated with much of Chinese cuisine. Hot chilli, ginger, garlic, sesame seeds, dry red chillis, black pepper corns and yoghurt are also frequently used in dishes. This makes Indian Chinese food similar in taste to many ethnic dishes in Southeast Asian countries such as Singapore and Malaysia, which have strong Chinese and Indian cultural influences.

Non-staple dishes are by default served with generous helpings of gravy, although they can also be ordered "dry" or "without gravy". Culinary styles often seen in Indian Chinese fare include "Chilli" (implying batter-fried items cooked with pieces of chilli pepper), "Manchurian" (implying a sweet and salty brown sauce), and "Schezwan" (sic - see below) (implying a spicy red sauce).

== Dishes ==
=== Appetizers ===
- Chicken lollipop – Chicken hors d'œuvre
- Hot and sour soup
- Manchow soup – Vegetable/chicken soup

=== Main dishes ===
The main ingredient in all these dishes can often be substituted with other meats, vegetables or paneer. Usually the nomenclature is such that the main ingredient is mentioned first, followed by the entree style, for example "Chilli Chicken". Many are available in both "dry" or "gravy" versions, varying the amount of sauce served in the dish.

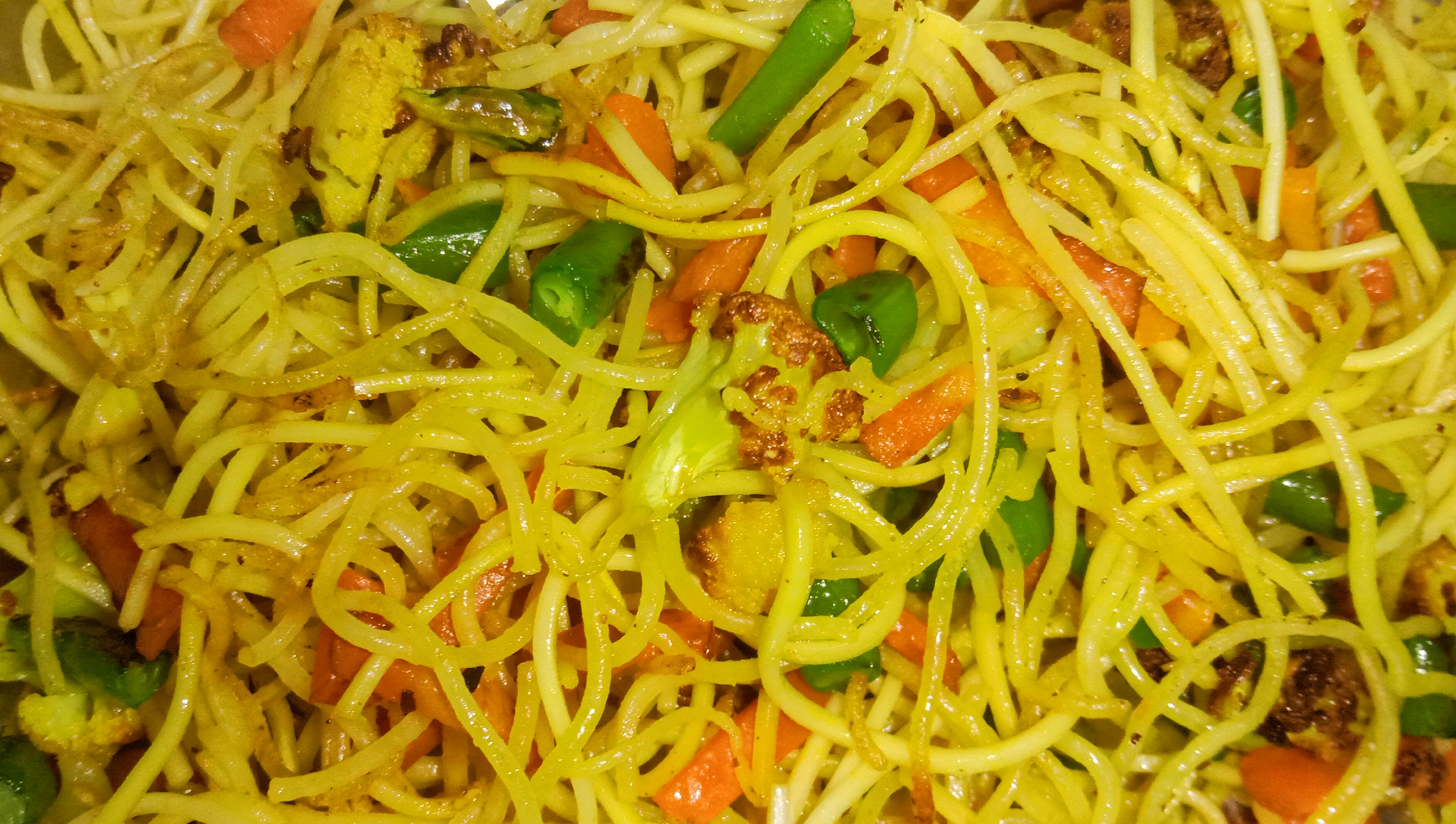
Veg chow mein from West Bengal

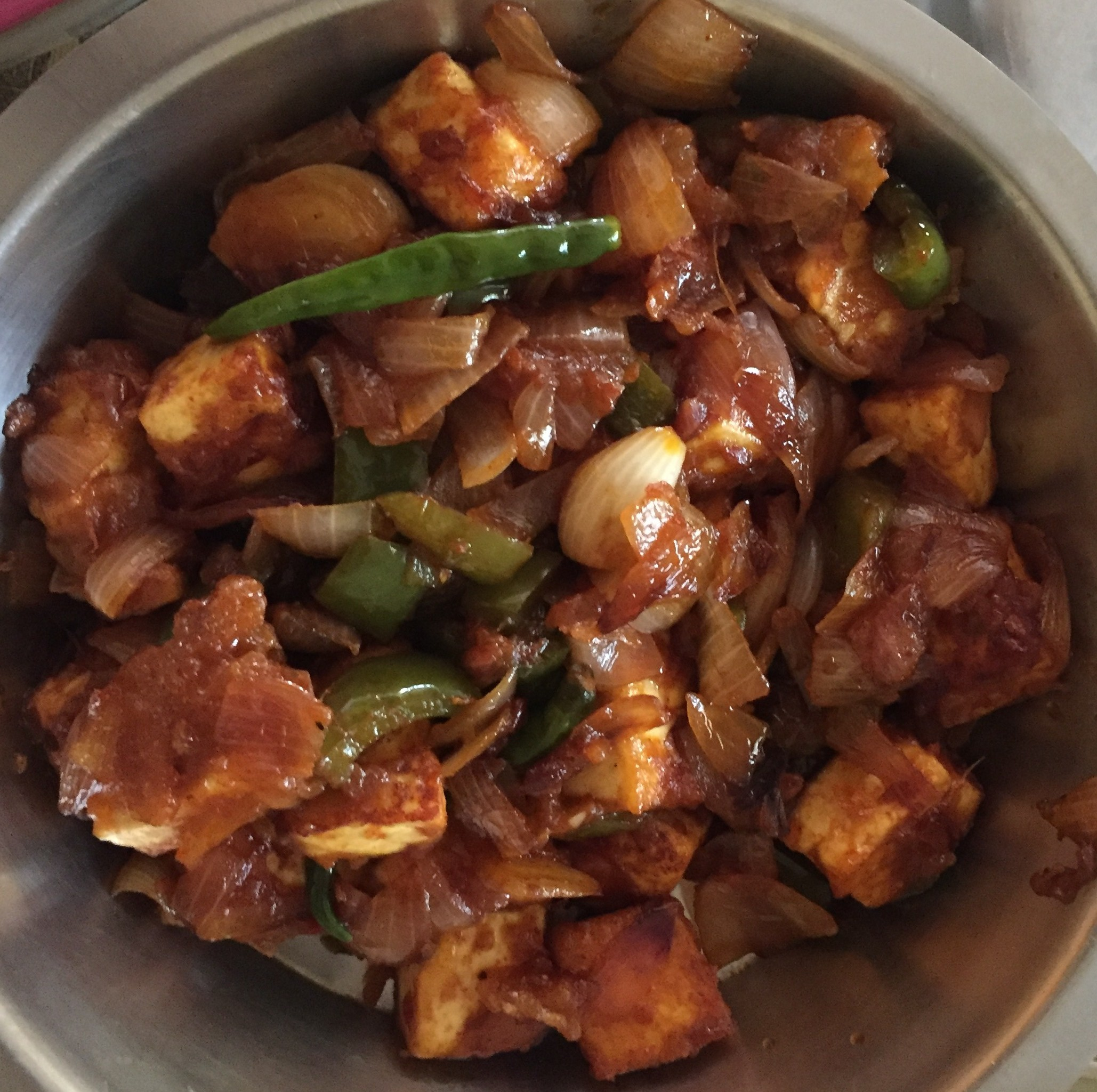
Chilli paneer

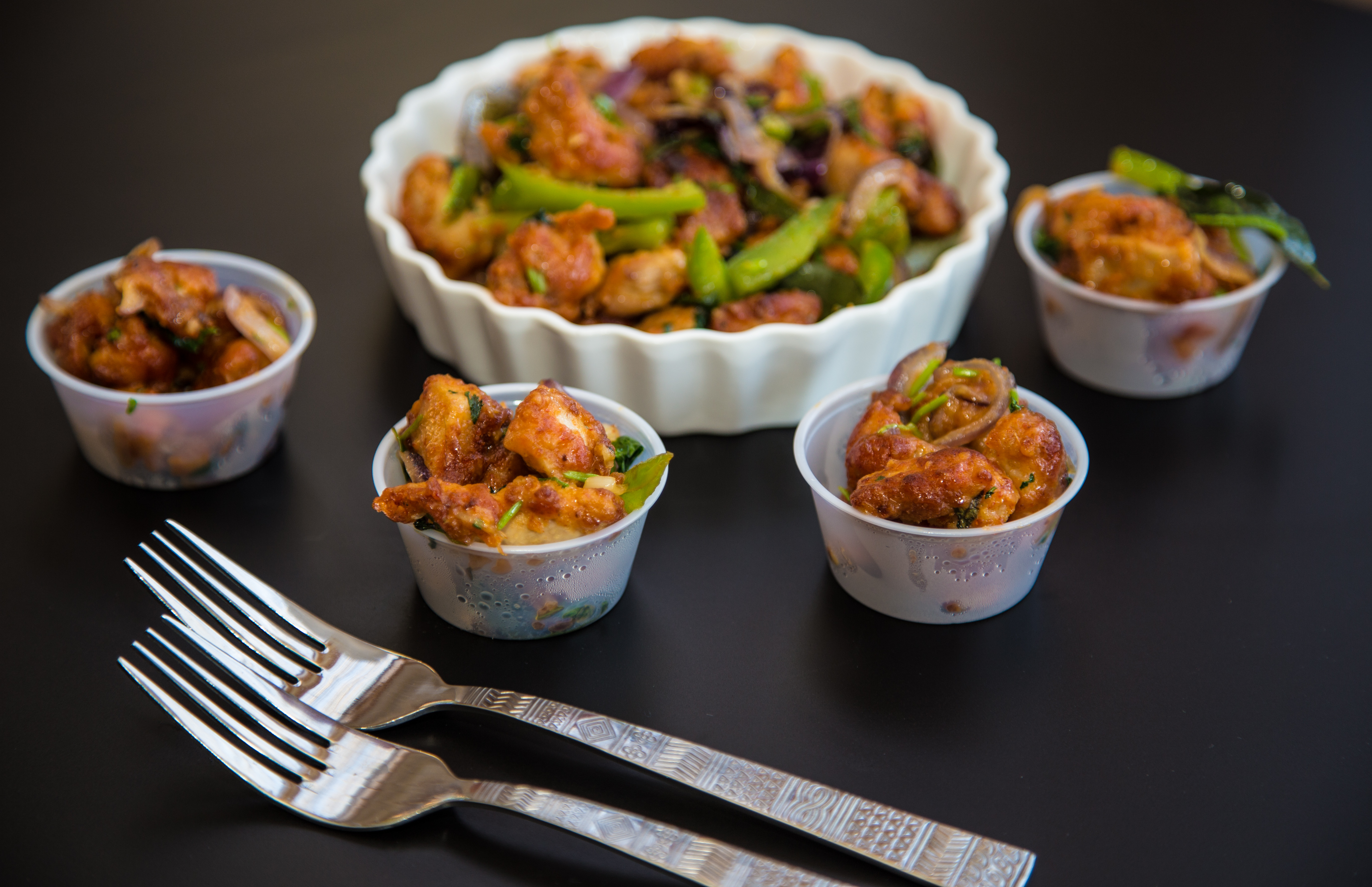
Chicken Manchurian

- Chilli chicken, dry or gravy
- Garlic chicken
- Chilli Paneer
- Schezwan (Note: "Schezwan" is the most common Indian English spelling variant rather than the conventional "Szechwan" or "Szechuan".) - A spicy and pungent sauce made with dry red chillies, garlic, shallots and spices. Dishes with this name in fact usually bear very little resemblance to ones from China's Sichuan Province, although they sometimes contain Sichuan peppercorns.
- Ginger chicken
- Manchurian, generally consisting of a variety of deep-fried meats, cauliflower (gobi) or paneer with vegetables in a spicy brown sauce. It is basically a creation of Chinese restaurants in India, and bears little resemblance to traditional Manchu cuisine or Chinese cuisine. It is said to have been invented in 1975 by Nelson Wang; Wang described his invention process as starting from the basic ingredients of an Indian dish, namely chopped garlic, ginger, and green chillis, but next, instead of adding garam masala, he put in soy sauce, followed by cornstarch and the chicken itself. A popular vegetarian variant replaces chicken with cauliflower, and is commonly known as gobi manchurian. Other vegetarian variants include mushroom, paneer, baby corn, veg Manchurian.
- Chow mein - A popular dish combining noodles, vegetables, meat, scrambled egg, ginger and garlic, soy sauce, green chili sauce, red chili sauce and vinegar.
- Hakka Noodles - Wheat noodles stir-fried with vegetables, chicken or meat, sauces, vinegar and other additions on high heat.
- Hong Kong Chicken
- Jalfrezi Chicken
- Lemon chicken
- Hunan chicken
- Sweet and Sour Chicken - Different from the American Version of Sweet and Sour, but similar to General Tso's Chicken.
- Chop suey American style & Chinese Style - Crispy Noodles with a variety of vegetables, chicken or meat and sauces.

=== Rice and noodles ===
Staple base options for an Indian Chinese meal include chicken, shrimp or vegetable variants of "Hakka" or "Schezwan" noodles popularly referred to as chow mein; and regular or "Schezwan" fried rice. American chop suey and sweet and sour dishes can be found at many restaurants. Some South Indian restaurants have also come up with spring rolls and "Schezwan" dosas.

=== Sweets and desserts ===
Indian Chinese dessert options include ice cream on honey-fried noodles or date pancakes.

=== Indian Chinese cuisine of Southeast Asia ===
In Southeast Asia, particularly Malaysia and Singapore, many popular dishes carry influence from both Indian and Chinese cuisine due to cultural syncretism. Malaysian and Singaporean Chinese cuisine is primarily based on Fujian, Cantonese, Teochew, and Hakka cuisines, while their Indian cuisine is primarily based on South Indian cuisine, especially from Tamil, Telugu, and Malayali cuisine. Chinese and Indian cultures have also fused in Singapore and Malaysia, with Chinese and Indian relationships being the most common intercultural relationships in both countries. Singaporean and Malaysian dishes that carry influence from both Indian and Chinese cuisines include fish head curry and mee goreng, and popular Indian Chinese dishes such as Manchurian and chili chicken are also popular in Singapore and Malaysia.

== Availability ==
Indian or Kolkata-style Chinese food is readily available in major metropolitan areas of India. It is also available in a number of towns and at dhabas adjacent to highways. Many restaurants have a Chinese section in their menus, and some are even dedicated to serving Indian Chinese food. It can also be found in mobile kitchen carts, prepared in woks over a portable gas burner. Manchurian sauce, Schezwan sauce, soy sauce fresh and dry Hakka noodles are available in many stores in cities across the country.

In 2007, Chinese cuisine ranked as India's favourite cuisine after local food, growing at 9% annually. It is the most favoured option when young people go out to eat and the second favourite (after south Indian cuisine) when families dine out.

Many Indian restaurants in the West and the Middle East also cater to the overseas Indians' nostalgic taste for Indian Chinese food. The cuisine is also branching out into the mainstream in major cities of North America. Chinese food in Nairobi, Kenya, also tends to be of this style. It is also available in Australia, especially in Brisbane, Melbourne and Sydney. In many of these places, the restaurants are labelled as Hakka Chinese, when in fact the cuisine itself has very little resemblance to authentic Hakka cuisine. The "Hakka" label in these restaurants are usually referring to the owner's origins, and many Chinese restaurant owners in India were of Hakka origin.

== See also ==
- Anglo-Indian cuisine
- Fusion cuisine
- Pakistani Chinese cuisine
