= Pakistani Chinese cuisine =

Fusion cuisine developed from admixed Pakistani and Chinese culinary traditions

Pakistani Chinese cuisine (Urdu: پاکستانی چینی پکوان}) comprises the styles and variations of Chinese cuisine that are cooked and consumed in Pakistan. Chinese migrants to Pakistan have developed a distinct Pakistani-style Chinese cuisine.

== History ==
Chinese cuisine in areas which today make up Pakistan has a history going back to restaurants established in the 1930s. One of these, the ABC Chinese Restaurant in Karachi, operated by a Chinese teacher Li Dianxiang, was once patronised by Zhou Enlai, and continued operating until 1988. Chinese restaurants are very popular amongst families as opposed to fast food and continental cuisine which is more favoured by the youth.

Pakistani Chinese food resembles Cantonese cuisine with its liberal use of chicken stock-based sauces seasoned with soy sauce, chili sauce, vinegar, monosodium glutamate and oyster sauce, but very rarely any fresh herbs. It is also a common practice in restaurants to serve Chinese dishes in sizzling platters. Vegetables used in Chinese cuisine are mostly cabbage, capsicum and onion, since broccoli or bok choy are not native vegetables. The extent of the popularity of Chinese food can be estimated from the fact that Chinese variations of local dishes have become quite popular like Chinese samosa, Chinese broast, and Chinese pulao.

Some newly opened restaurants like Ginsoy have been prospering in the city of Karachi. The food offered at Chinese restaurants in Karachi is a blend of Chinese cooking with Pakistani style influences. More recently in Islamabad, the Phoenix restaurant has become well-known. Their clientele includes ex-president Pervez Musharraf and ex-prime minister Shaukat Aziz; Musharraf is said to enjoy their prawns, Peking duck, stir-fried beef, and garlic lamb chops. Chicken Manchurian, one of the most popular Pakistani Chinese dishes, is an Indo-Chinese dish that normally consists of chicken with occasional vegetables in a spicy sauce. It is entirely a creation of Chinese restaurants in India, being consumed in India and Pakistan in general, and bears little resemblance to traditional Chinese cuisine.

== Dishes ==
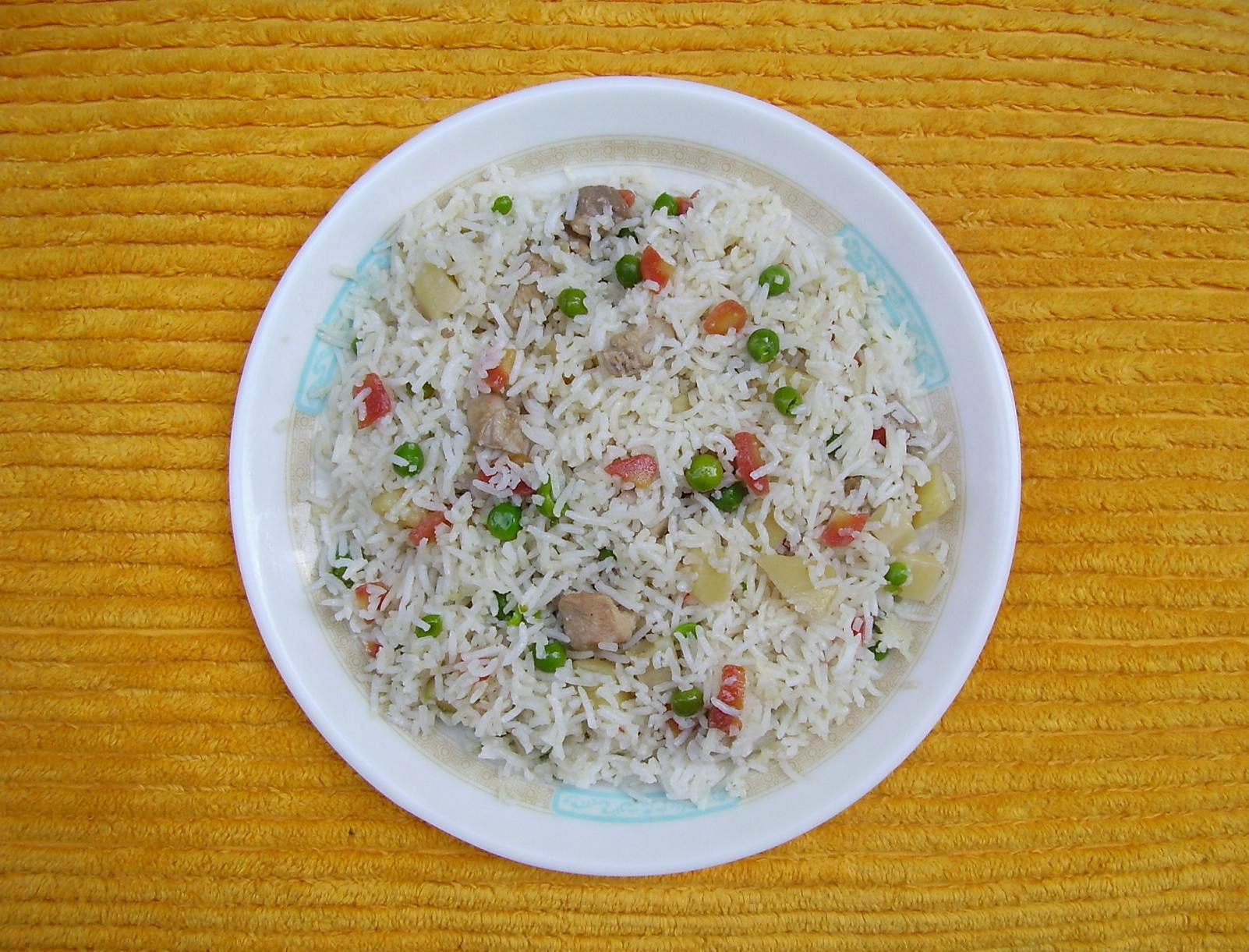
Pakistani-style Chinese pulao

Amongst some of the most popular Pakistani-Chinese dishes are:

- Chicken Manchurian - the most popular dish with pieces of stir fried chicken served in a red ketchup based sauce. It is normally served with egg or chicken fried rice.
- Chicken with Lime - stir fried chicken served in a sizzling lemon and/or lime sauce.
- Sweet and Sour Chicken or Prawns - meat, capsicum, onions and pineapple chunks with a red sweet and sour sauce.
- Chinese rice - Basmati is the most common form of rice used. The most famous rice recipes are egg and chicken fried rice.
- Chicken Honey Wings - Chicken wings dipped in a coating of sweet honey paste.
- Chinese soup - Chicken corn soup and hot and sour soup are ubiquitous in restaurants, homes, and on TV. These are served with staples such as vinegar (sirka) and chili pepper.
- Noodles - Chicken chowmein and chopsuey are popular. Their method of cooking employs hearty use of soy sauce, ajinomoto, vinegar and chili sauce with vegetables, boneless chicken and/or Keema (minced meat). Oil concentrations are higher than normal Chinese noodles.

== See also ==
- Chinese cuisine
