= Manchuria (disambiguation) =

Manchuria is an exonym for a region of northeast Asia.

Manchuria may also refer to:

- The traditional homelands of the Jurchens
- The traditional homelands of the Manchus
- Later Jin (1616–1636), the Manchu state prior to the establishment of the Qing Empire
- Manchukuo, the Manchu puppet state of Imperial Japan from 1932 to 1945
- Northeast China (Manchuria), the northeastern region of China
- Manchuria Station, a stopping point on the Trans-Siberian Railway now known as Manzhouli
- Outer Manchuria, territories ceded by China to Russia in the mid-19th century
- the Manchuria, a steamship
- Manchuria - a sub-region in Apulia, Italy

== See also ==
- Jurchen Jin dynasty
- Manchu (disambiguation)
- Manchuria under Yuan, Ming, and Qing rule
- Manchurian (disambiguation)
- Manchurians (disambiguation)
- Gobi Manchurian (Indo-Chinese food)
