= Manchu cuisine =

Culinary traditions of Manchuria

- Traditional Chinese: 滿洲菜
- Simplified Chinese: 满洲菜
Transcriptions
Standard Mandarin
- Hanyu Pinyin: Mǎnzhōu cài

Manchu cuisine or Manchurian cuisine is the cuisine of Manchuria (Northeast China) and Outer Manchuria (also known as Russian Manchuria). It uses the traditional Manchu staple foods of millet, soybean, peas, corn and broomcorn. It relies heavily on preserved foods (often pickled) due to the harsh winters and scorching summers in Northeast China. Manchu cuisine is also known for grilling, wild meat, strong flavours and the wide use of soy sauce. Manchu cuisine is more wheat-based than Han Chinese cuisines.

== History ==
The ancestors of the Manchus were the Jurchen and Mohe people. The Mohe enjoyed eating pork, practised pig farming extensively, and were mainly sedentary, and also used both pig and dog skins for coats. They were predominantly farmers who grew soybean, wheat, millet and rice, in addition to engaging in hunting.

The Manchu Han Imperial Feast (满汉全席; 滿漢全席; Mǎnhàn quán xí) includes many notable dishes in Manchu cuisine. This banquet combined the best cuisine from the Manchus, Han Chinese, Mongols, Hui people and Tibetans. It included 108 dishes (of which 54 are northern dishes and 54 are southern dishes) that would be eaten over three days. The Manchu palace banquets were subdivided into six grades. The first, second and third grades were prepared for deceased imperial ancestors. The fourth grade food was served to the imperial family during the Chinese New Year and other festivals. The fifth and sixth grades were served on all other occasions.

== Notable dishes in Manchu cuisine ==
The typical Manchu dishes include pickled vegetables. Manchurian hot pot (满洲火锅; 滿洲火鍋; Mǎnzhōu huǒguō) is a traditional dish, made with pickled Chinese cabbage, pork and mutton.

Bairou xuechang (白肉血肠; 白肉血腸; báiròu xuěcháng; 'white meat blood sausage') is a soup with pork and blood sausage and pickled Chinese cabbage.

Suziyie doubao (苏子叶豆包; 蘇子葉豆包; sūzǐyè dòubāo) is a steamed bun, stuffed with sweetened, mashed beans and wrapped with perilla leaves outside.

Sachima is a candied fritter similar to Tatar Çäkçäk, which is a very popular sweet.

Other common dishes are:

- suancai cuan bairou (酸菜白肉; suāncài báiròu; sour vegetables with boiled meat),
- suan tangzi (酸汤子; 酸湯子; suān tāngzǐ; a sour soup with fermented corn flour),
- di san xian (stir-fried eggplant, potato and green pepper),
- Manchu sausage,
- lüdagun (a steamed roll made of bean flour), and
- niushe bing (牛舌饼; 牛舌餅; níushé bǐng; a type of cake).

=== Manchurian/Manchow dishes in India ===
The popular Indian Chinese style of cooking known as Manchurian, where an ingredient is first deep-fried and then sauteed in a spicy sauce, was invented in India and bears little if any relation to actual Manchu cooking. Manchow soup is also an Indian creation.

== See also ==
- China–India relations
  - Chindians
  - Historical and cultural relations between China and India
- List of deep-fried foods
- List of vegetable dishes
- Manchow soup
- Manchurian (dish)
