= Nelson Wang =

Chinese-Indian restaurateur (born 1950)

- Traditional Chinese: 黃玉堂
- Simplified Chinese: 黃玉堂
Transcriptions
Standard Mandarin
- Hanyu Pinyin: Huáng Yùtáng

Nelson Wang (born 1950) is an Indian restaurateur of Chinese descent and the founder of China Garden, a restaurant in Mumbai's Kemps Corner neighborhood. Various sources credit him with the invention of the popular Indian/Chinese dish "Chicken Manchurian".

== Background ==
Wang was born in Kolkata in 1950. He was the son of a Chinese immigrant. However, within a few days of his birth, his father died, and he was sent to live with a foster family by his mother. His foster father was a chef, to whom Wang attributed his own love of cooking.

== Early career ==
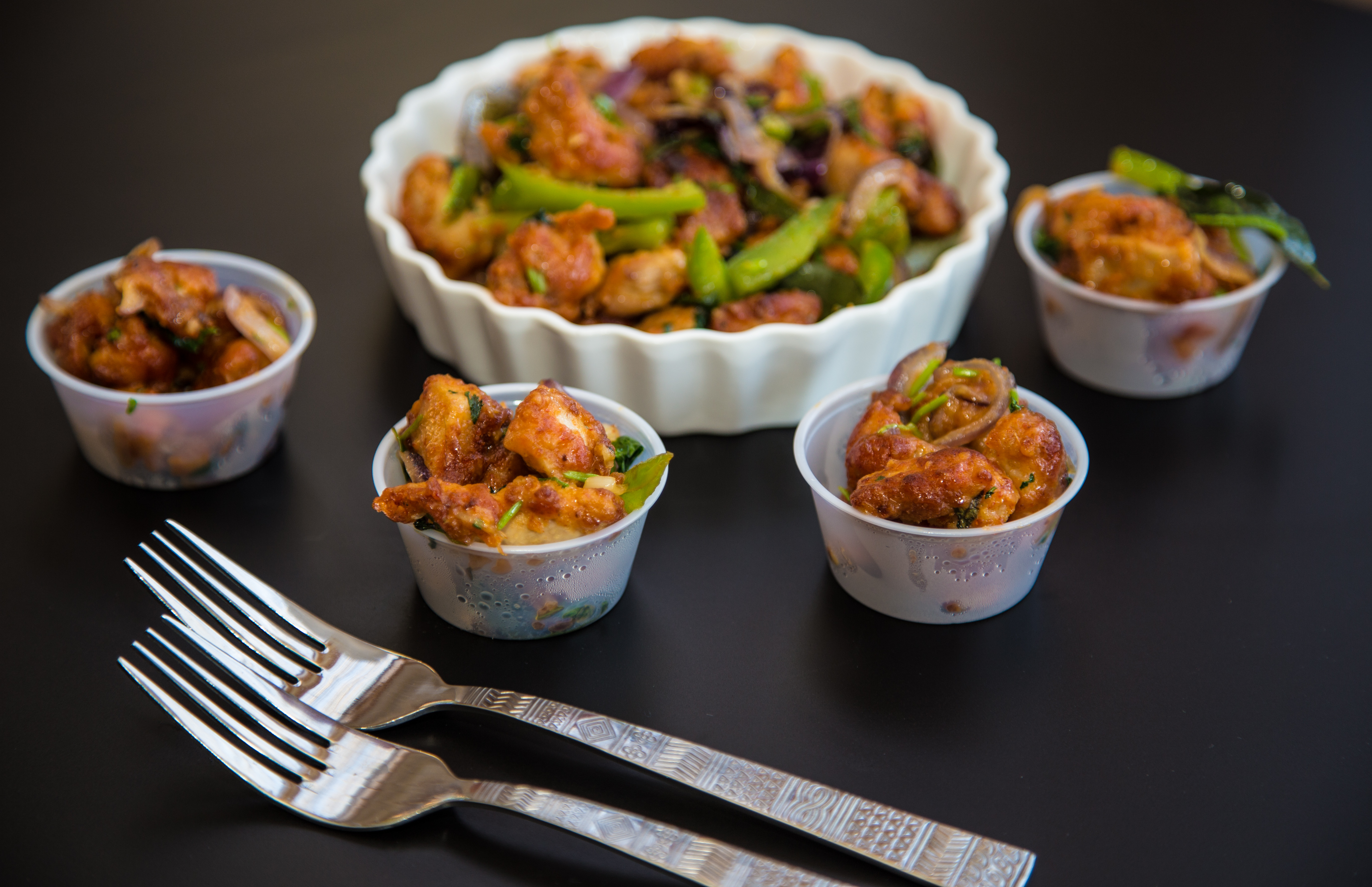
Chicken Manchurian served at a restaurant in Hyderabad

Wang came to Mumbai in 1974, with just ₹27 in his pocket. His first job there was in a small restaurant in Colaba. He also worked a variety of other odd jobs, including being a limbo dancer, at which he claimed to be skilled. According to Wang himself, he was a cook at the Cricket Club of India, when in 1975, a customer asked him to create a new dish, different from what was available on the menu. He started by taking the basic ingredients of an Indian dish, namely chopped garlic, ginger, and green chilis; but next, instead of adding garam masala, he put in soy sauce, followed by cornstarch and the chicken itself. The result was Chicken Manchurian.

== China Garden ==
Wang branched out from his job at the CCI in 1983 to start his own restaurant. His restaurant gained popularity, and won various awards proclaiming it "India's best restaurant". Wang and China Garden have also been credited with inventing or popularizing a number of other Indian Chinese dishes, including creamy corn cream, chicken lollipops, date pancakes, and hot and sour soup. He and his sons Henry and Eddie would go on to open several restaurants in various parts of India, including Mumbai, Delhi, Gurugram, Hyderabad, Bangaluru, Pune, and Goa. Their food os also available in Nepal also in Kathmandu.

The restaurant encountered trouble in 1999, when a court ordered it to close for violating Coastal Regulation Zone rules about building floor area, in a case that took more than fourteen years. A Rediff columnist criticised the ruling as making "no sense". He reopened the restaurant at the Crossroads Mall in August 2000.

Since then, China Garden has reopened in its original location at Om Chambers.
