= Cricket Club of India =

Cricket club Mumbai, India

- Sport: Cricket
- Abbreviation: CCI
- Founded: 1933
- Affiliation: Board of Control for Cricket in India
- Headquarters: Brabourne Stadium
- Location: Mumbai
- President: Madhumati Lele

Official website
- www.thecricketclubofindia.com
- Other key staff: 17
- (India)

The Cricket Club of India (CCI) is a cricket club located on Dinsha Wacha Road, in Churchgate of Mumbai. It was conceived as India's counterpart to the Marylebone Cricket Club (MCC). It is considered one of the most prestigious clubs in the nation. The CCI uses the Brabourne Stadium for cricket games. It is affiliated to the Board of Control for Cricket in India.

== History ==
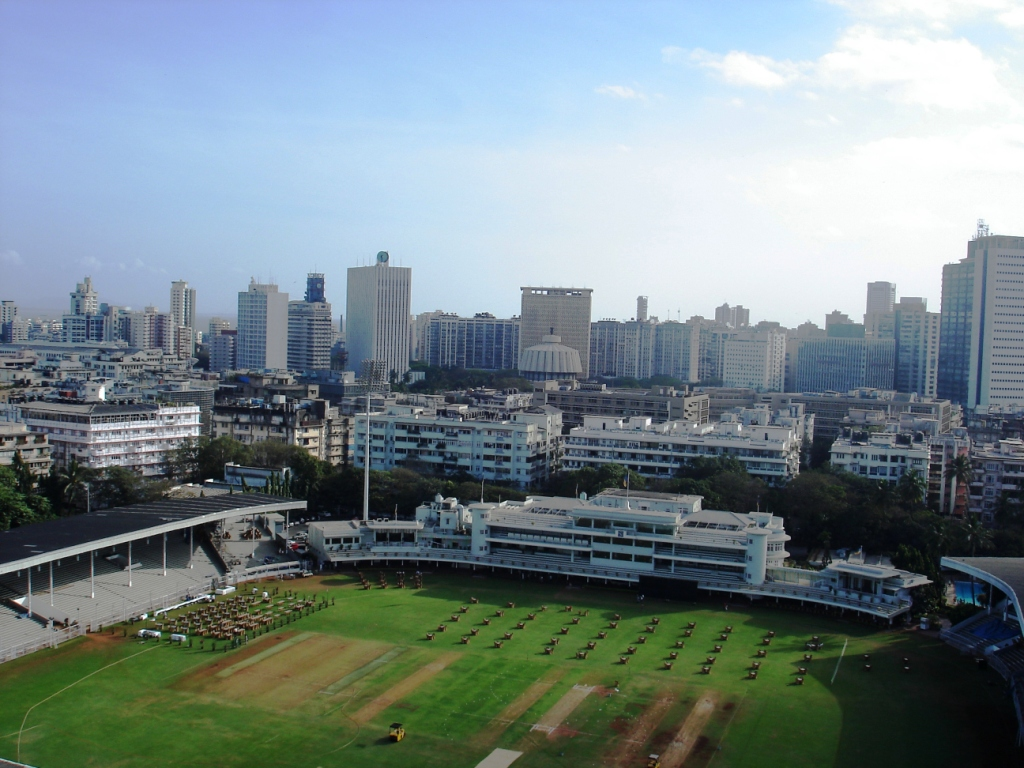
Brabourne Stadium houses the CCI in Mumbai

On 8 November 1933, the Cricket Club of India was incorporated as a company limited by guarantee with its registered office in New Delhi. The principal object of the company was to promote sports in general, and cricket in particular, throughout the country. The founders of the BCCI were the promoters of the club. Originally, life members, later termed as founder members, paid Rs 100 and ordinary members paid Rs 10 for entrance.

The Cricket Club of India was also the birthplace of the famous Chinese-style dish Chicken Manchurian. Restaurateur Nelson Wang claims to have invented it at the request of a customer in 1975, while working as a cook at the CCI. BCCI's headquarters were within the CCI until 2007, when it was moved on the premises of the Mumbai Cricket Association at the Wankhede stadium. Brabourne Stadium served as the primary home ground of the Mumbai cricket team until the construction of the Wankhede Stadium in 1974.

== First-class cricket ==
Teams representing the Cricket Club of India played 13 first-class matches between 1935 and 1958, most of them against touring teams. Nine of the matches were played at Brabourne Stadium.

== Facilities ==
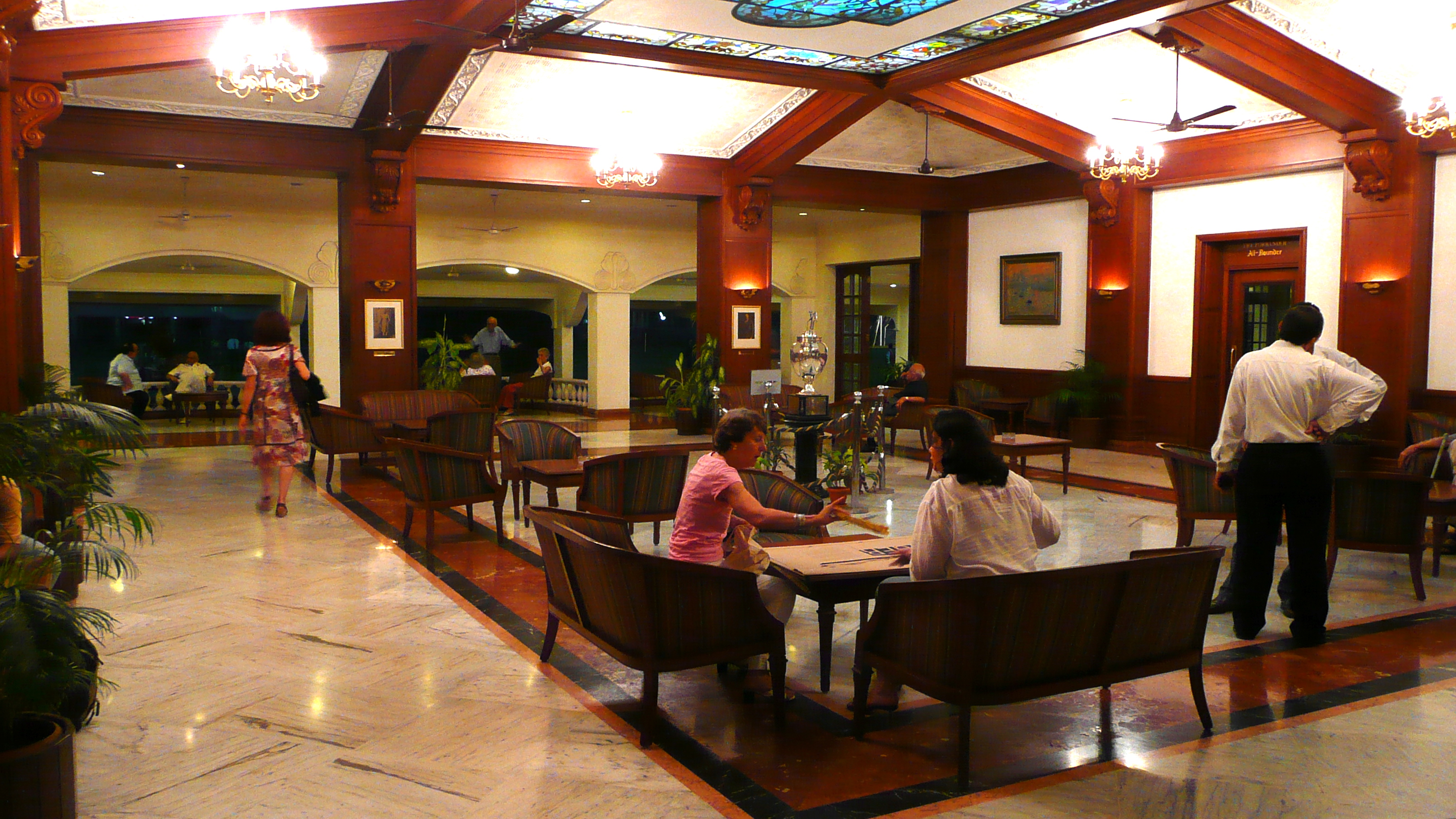
Main lobby of the club with a replica of the Ranji Trophy in the centre

The CCI is situated in the Brabourne Stadium, which the club owns. The CCI is an affiliated member of the BCCI like any other state association but unlike any of the others, it does not conduct cricket in the state. Mumbai Cricket Association, Maharashtra Cricket Association and Vidarbha Cricket Association conduct cricket in Mumbai and rest of Maharashtra respectively. The stadium has one of the best cricket pitches and grounds in the region. It also has tennis courts, a swimming pool, fitness centers, a billiards room, squash courts, badminton courts, table tennis tables, cafes, bars, a library, a reading room and a banquet hall. It is very difficult to get membership of this exclusive club.

== Kingfisher Open ==
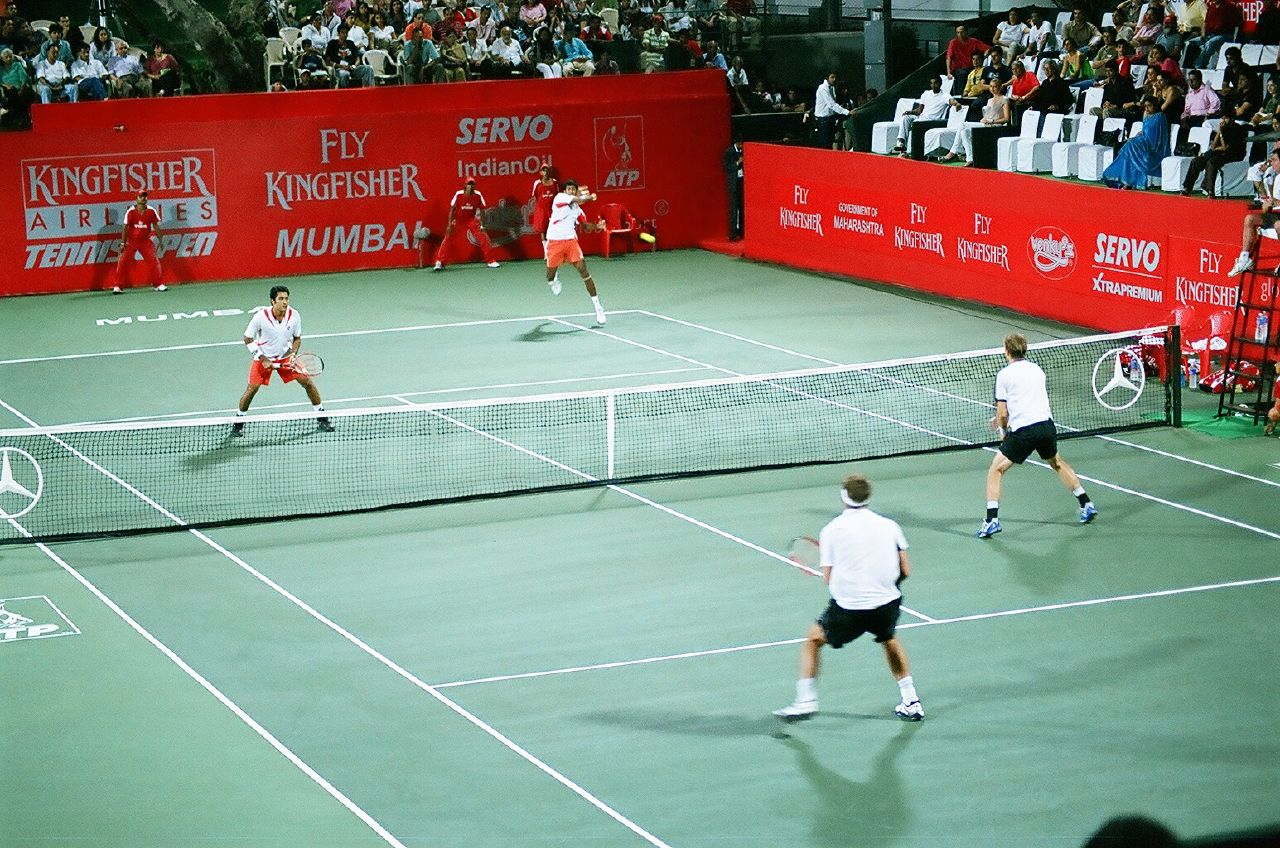
The men's doubles final in 2007

In 2006 and 2007, the CCI tennis courts hosted the Kingfisher Airlines Tennis Open, an ATP Tour tournament, previously held in Shanghai from 1995 to 2004 and in Vietnam in 2005. Kingfisher Airlines were the official sponsors. The tournament was presented by the Government of Maharashtra, India. The tournament was played from 25 September 2006 to 2 October 2006.

== ICC Champions Trophy ==
The Cricket Club of India Limited staged 5 matches of the ICC Champions Trophy, including the final between Australia and West Indies played on 5 November 2006.

== 2013 ICC Women's World Cup ==
The Brabourne Stadium hosted the 2013 Women's Cricket World Cup along with the MIG Cricket Club, the DREIMS ground and the Barabati Stadium. The Brabourne Stadium hosted the final, where Australia comprehensively beat the West Indies.

== Membership scam ==
In 2013, an internal inquiry concluded that at least 11 members had gained membership through forgery. Several CCI members revealed that the fraud was committed by accessing the files of deceased members, and replacing their details with those of the new members.
