= The Manchurian Candidate (disambiguation) =

The Manchurian Candidate is a 1959 political thriller novel by Richard Condon.

The Manchurian Candidate may also refer to:

- The Manchurian Candidate (1962 film), starring Frank Sinatra
- The Manchurian Candidate (2004 film), the remake of the 1962 version starring Denzel Washington

== See also ==
- Manchurian (disambiguation)
