= Chilli chicken =

Indo-Chinese dish

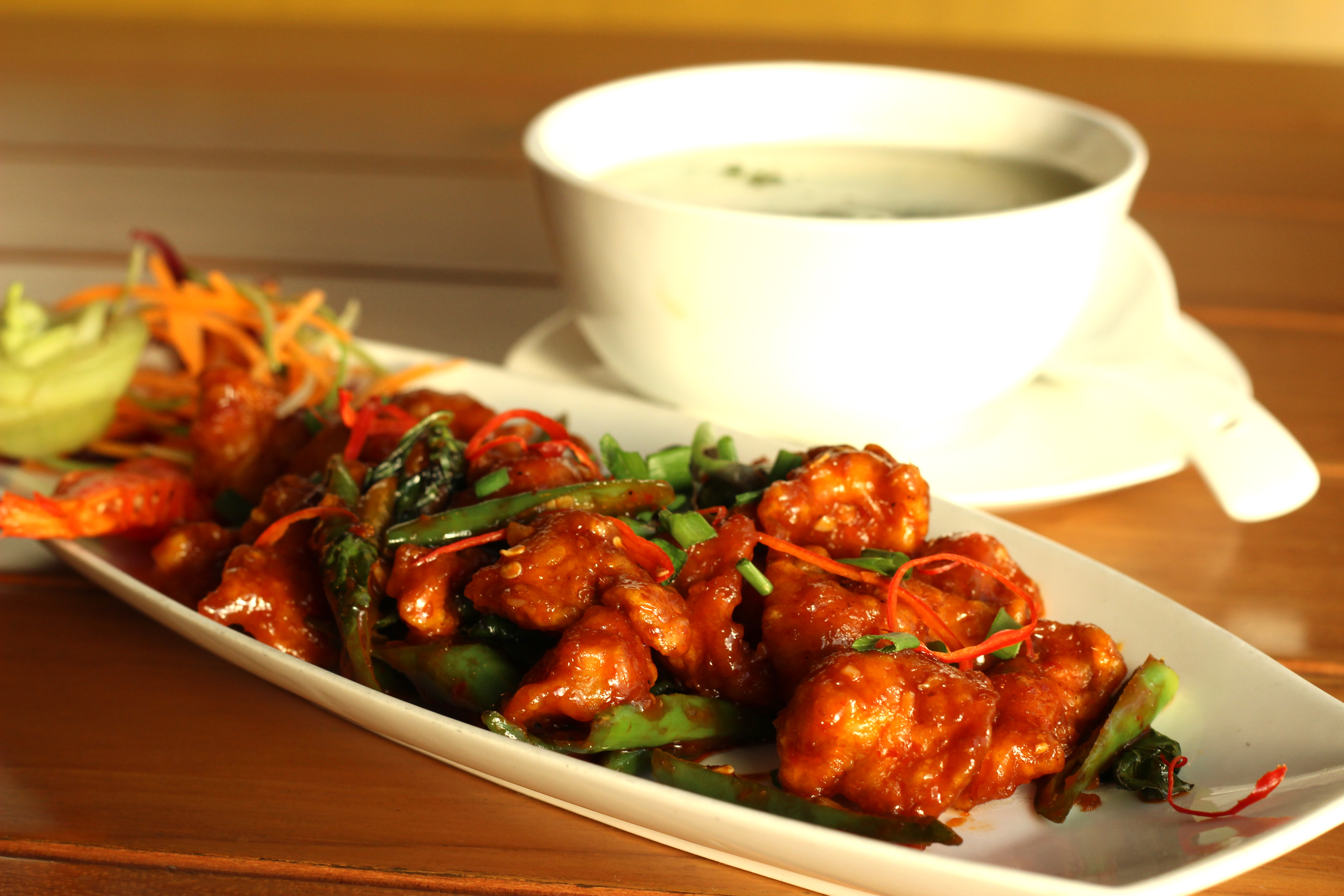
- Dry chilli chicken
- Course: Starters
- Place of origin: Kolkata, India
- Region or state: India
- Serving temperature: Hot
- Main ingredients: Chicken, ginger and garlic paste, lemon juice

Chilli chicken is a popular Indo-Chinese dish that uses chicken, and is of Chinese heritage. In India, this may include a variety of dry chicken preparations. Though mainly boneless chicken is used in this dish, some recipes also use bone-in chicken.

== Recipes ==
Chilli chicken comes in several variations with differences in spices and seasoning, as well as its "sauce" and "dry" variants with differences in their quantity of sauce or gravy. The South Asian contributions to this dish are in the spices used, while the Cantonese contributions include the sweet and savoury flavours along with the Chinese cooking techniques used in its preparation.

Numerous recipes exist for the dish of the same name depending on the restaurateur, including:

- Green chilli chicken.
- Tangrai chilli chicken.
- Chinese chilli chicken.
- Bengal chilli chicken.

== See also ==
- Chili shrimp
- Laziji, similar dish in authentic Sichuan cuisine in China
- Indian Chinese cuisine
- List of chicken dishes
