= Manchurians =

Manchurians may refer to people inhabiting:

- Manchuria, region of northeast Asia
- Northeast China, part of Manchuria located in China
- Manchukuo, short-lived state in Northeast China

Manchurians may also refer to:

- Manchu people, ethnic group for whom Manchuria is named

== See also ==
- Manchuria (disambiguation)
- Manchurian (disambiguation)
- Manchu (disambiguation)
