= Manchu (surname) =

Manchu is an Indian surname. People with this surname include:

- Manchu Bhaktavatsalam popularly known as Mohan Babu is a Telugu film actor, producer and politician.
- Manoj Manchu, Indian actor
- Lakshmi Manchu, Indian actress
- Vishnu Manchu, Indian actor
