= Manchu Empire =

Manchu Empire may refer to:

- Qing dynasty (大清帝國), 1644–1912; the last imperial dynasty of China
- Manchukuo (大滿洲帝國), 1932–1945; Japanese puppet kingdom
