= Philippe Bouchet (illustrator) =

French artist

Manchu
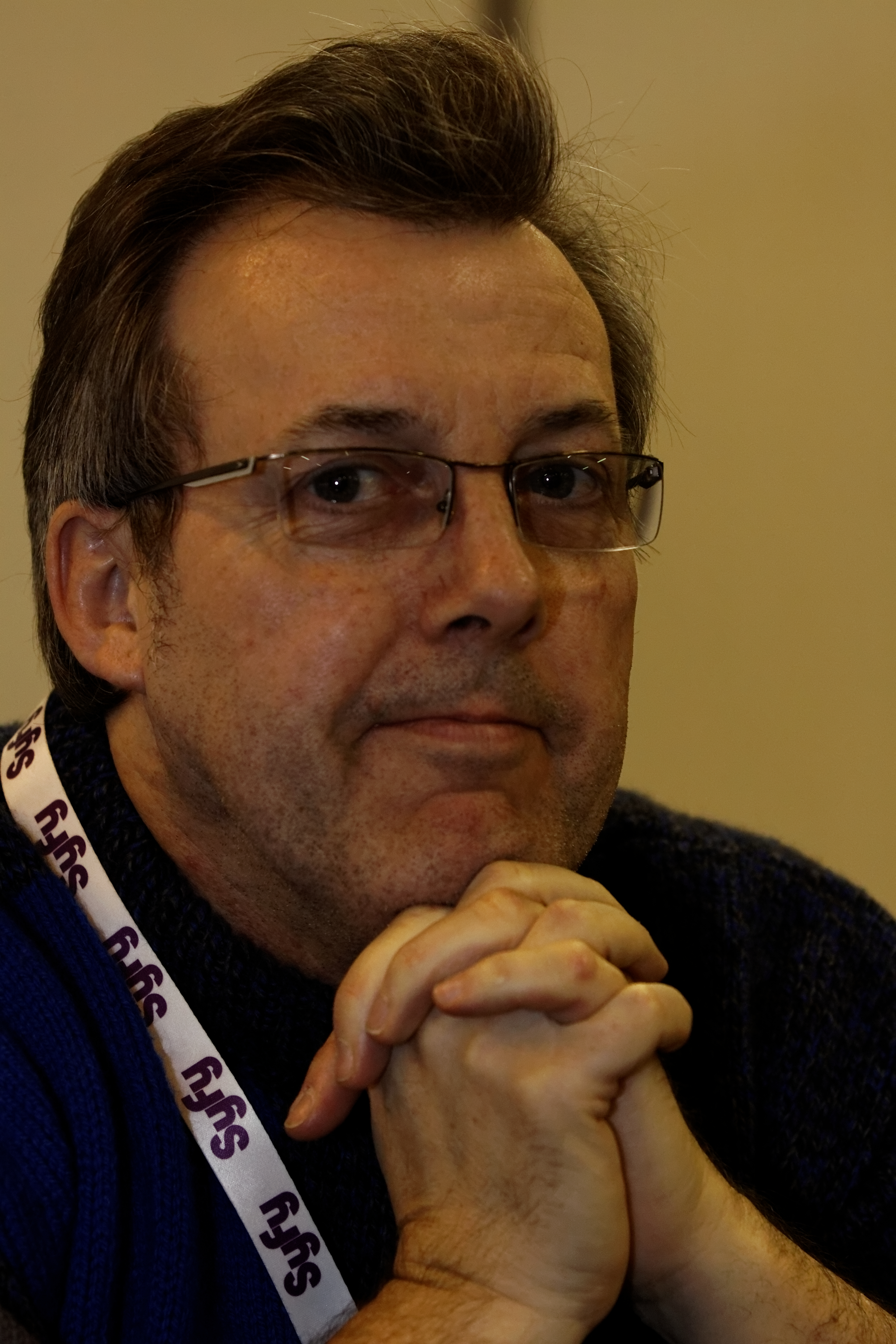
- Manchu at Paris Manga 2012.
- Born: Philippe Bouchet; 19 March 1956 (age 70); Cholet, Maine-et-Loire, France
- Other name: Manchu
- Occupation: Illustrator

Philippe Bouchet (French pronunciation: [filip buʃɛ]; born 19 March 1956), better known as Manchu, is a science-fiction illustrator.

He provided drawings and concepts for the animated series Once Upon a Time... Space and Ulysses 31.

== Biography ==
At the age of 12, when Stanley Kubrick’s film 2001: A Space Odyssey was released, and 13 when Neil Armstrong took his first steps on the Moon, he initially aspired to become an astronaut. He chose his pseudonym after a horror film, The Mask of Fu Manchu, starring Boris Karloff as Dr. Fu Manchu, a character from the novels of Sax Rohmer.

From a young age, Manchu filled his sketchbooks with drawings of cowboys, Native Americans, various machines, and American cars. His parents' profession likely influenced him, as he later noted: “I may have been unconsciously guided by my father, who was an upholsterer and decorator and who sketched armchairs and sofas with colored pencils in a rather expressive style.”

Having adjusted his ambitions over the years, he turned to animation after obtaining a CAP (vocational certificate) in advertising illustration, following three years of training at the École Brassart. He contributed to the animated series Once Upon a Time... Space and Ulysses 31.

He ventured into science fiction illustration in 1984 after meeting Gérard Klein, who invited him to illustrate volumes for the La Grande Anthologie de la science-fiction collection for Le Livre de Poche. He went on to create half of the cover illustrations for the series. This collaboration lasted about fifteen years, during which he illustrated more than two hundred books.

He has worked with numerous publishers, including Le Livre de Poche, Denoël (for the Lunes d'encre collection), Delcourt, Gallimard (Folio SF collection), Mnemos, L'Atalante, Robert Laffont, Le Bélial', Bragelonne, ActuSF, Mango, Pocket (Pocket SF collection), and Fleuve Noir. He has also contributed to scientific magazines such as Ciel et Espace, Sciences et Avenir, and Sciences et Vie Junior, as well as working for organizations like the French National Center for Space Studies (CNES), the European Space Agency (ESA), and companies such as Thomson, as well as associations like Planète Mars (APM).

His influences are diverse, including Robert McCall, Chris Foss, and Chesley Bonestell.

== Bibliography ==
- Art of Manchu 1 – Science (fiction), Delcourt, 2002, 96 p. (bilingual English-French art book)
- Manchu Sketchbook (Comix Buro, 2008)
- Art of Manchu 2 – Starship(s), Delcourt, 2010, 96 p. (bilingual English-French art book)
- Art of Manchu 3 – Space-O-Matic, Delcourt, 2017, 93 p. (bilingual English-French art book)
- Space-O-Matic, Delcourt, 2017, 96 p. (bilingual English-French art book)

== Prizes ==
- Prix Bob-Morane 2001
- Grand Prix de l'Imaginaire 2001
- Prix Extraordinaire aux Utopiales 2015
- Prix du meilleur artiste européen 2015
