= Manshu Musume =

"Manshū Musume" (Japanese: 満州娘, lit. Manchurian Girl) is a Japanese hit song in 1938. Lyrics is by Akiji Ishimatsu and Music is by Tetsuo Suzuki.
