= Manchurian (dish) =

Deep-fried savory dish in Indo-Chinese cuisine

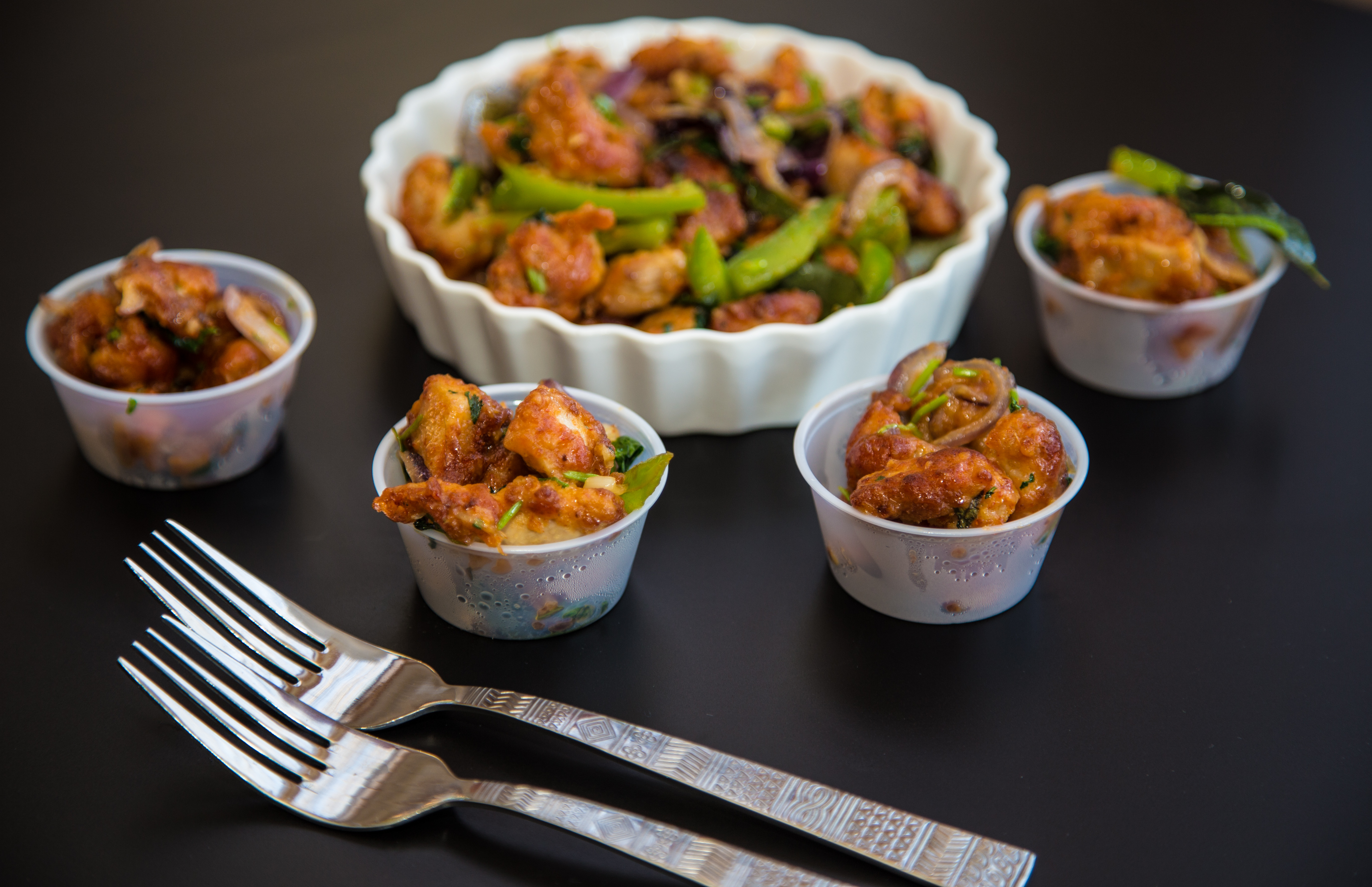
- Chicken Manchurian served in Hyderabad, India
- Type: Fritter
- Course: Snack
- Place of origin: Mumbai, India
- Created by: Nelson Wang
- Invented: 1975
- Main ingredients: Cauliflower (for vegetarian variant); Chicken (for meat variant)
- Ingredients generally used: Chopped onion, capsicum, garlic

Manchurian is a class of Indian Chinese dishes made by roughly chopping and deep-frying ingredients such as chicken, cauliflower (gobi), prawns, fish, mutton, and paneer, and then sautéeing them in a sauce flavored with soy sauce. While not a Chinese dish, it is the result of the adaptation of Chinese cooking and seasoning techniques specifically aimed to suit Indian tastes and has become a staple of Indian-Chinese cuisine.

== History ==
The word Manchurian means native or inhabitant of Manchuria (in northeast China); the dish, however, is a creation of Chinese restaurants in India, and bears little resemblance to traditional Manchu cuisine or Northeastern Chinese cuisine. It is said to have been invented in 1975 by Nelson Wang, a cook at the Cricket Club of India in Mumbai, when a customer asked him to create a new dish, rather than what was on the menu. Wang described the invention process as starting from the basic ingredients of an Indian dish, namely chopped garlic, ginger, and green chilis, but next, instead of adding garam masala, he put in soy sauce, followed by cornstarch and the chicken itself. The dish is popular across South Asia. A popular vegetarian variant replaces chicken with cauliflower, and is commonly known as gobi manchurian.

== Variations ==
There are two different variants of Manchurian: dry or semi-dry, and with gravy. Both variants are prepared by using common ingredients like corn flour, maida flour, spring onion, bell peppers, soy sauce, chili sauce, minced garlic, and ground pepper, and are typically garnished with spring onion. Some recipes call for use of monosodium glutamate (MSG) to increase the taste profile, though there are those who avoid it due to the common misconception that it causes headaches. Its taste can vary from mildly spicy to hot and fiery based on the recipe and personal preference.

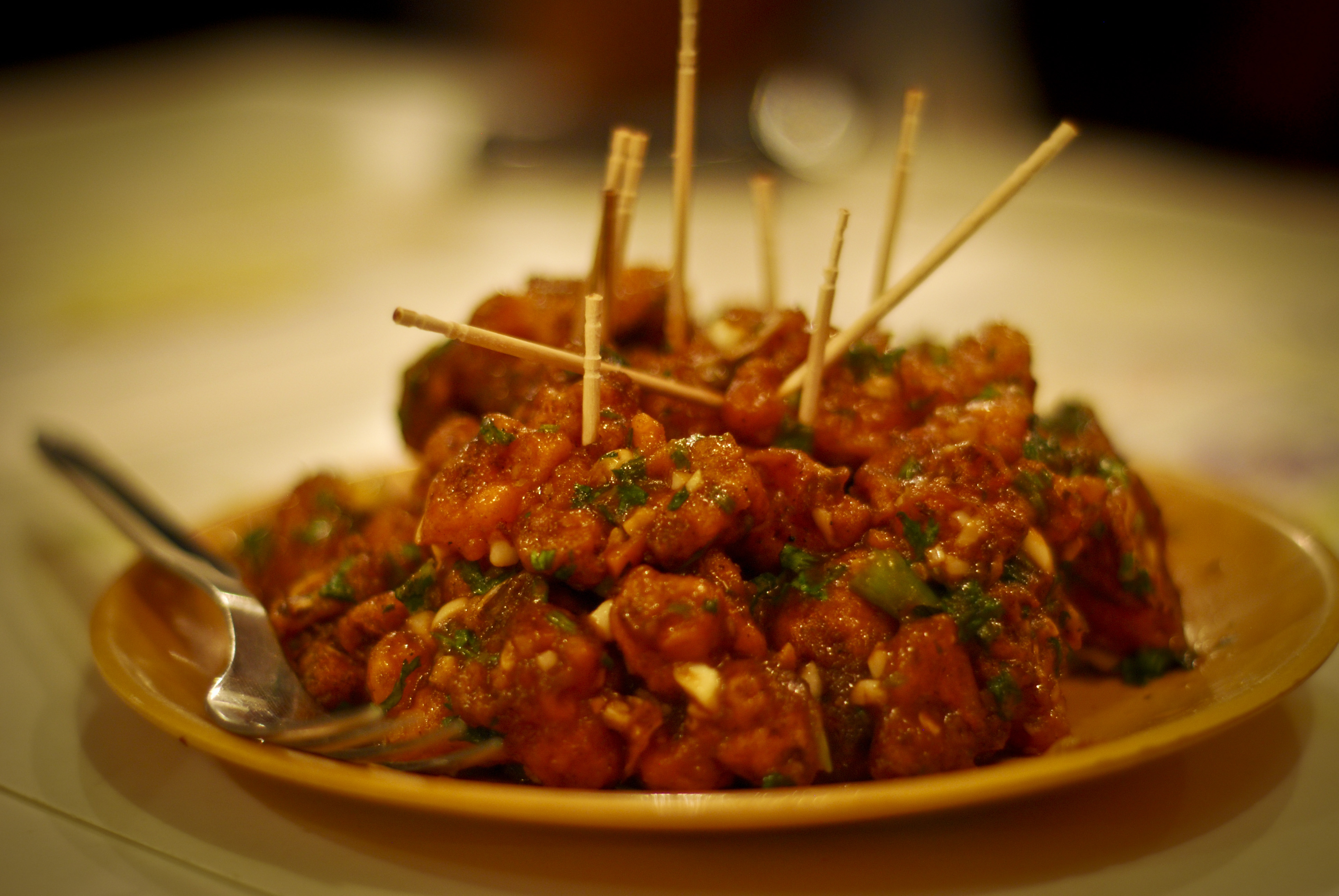
Semi-dry gobi (cauliflower) Manchurian

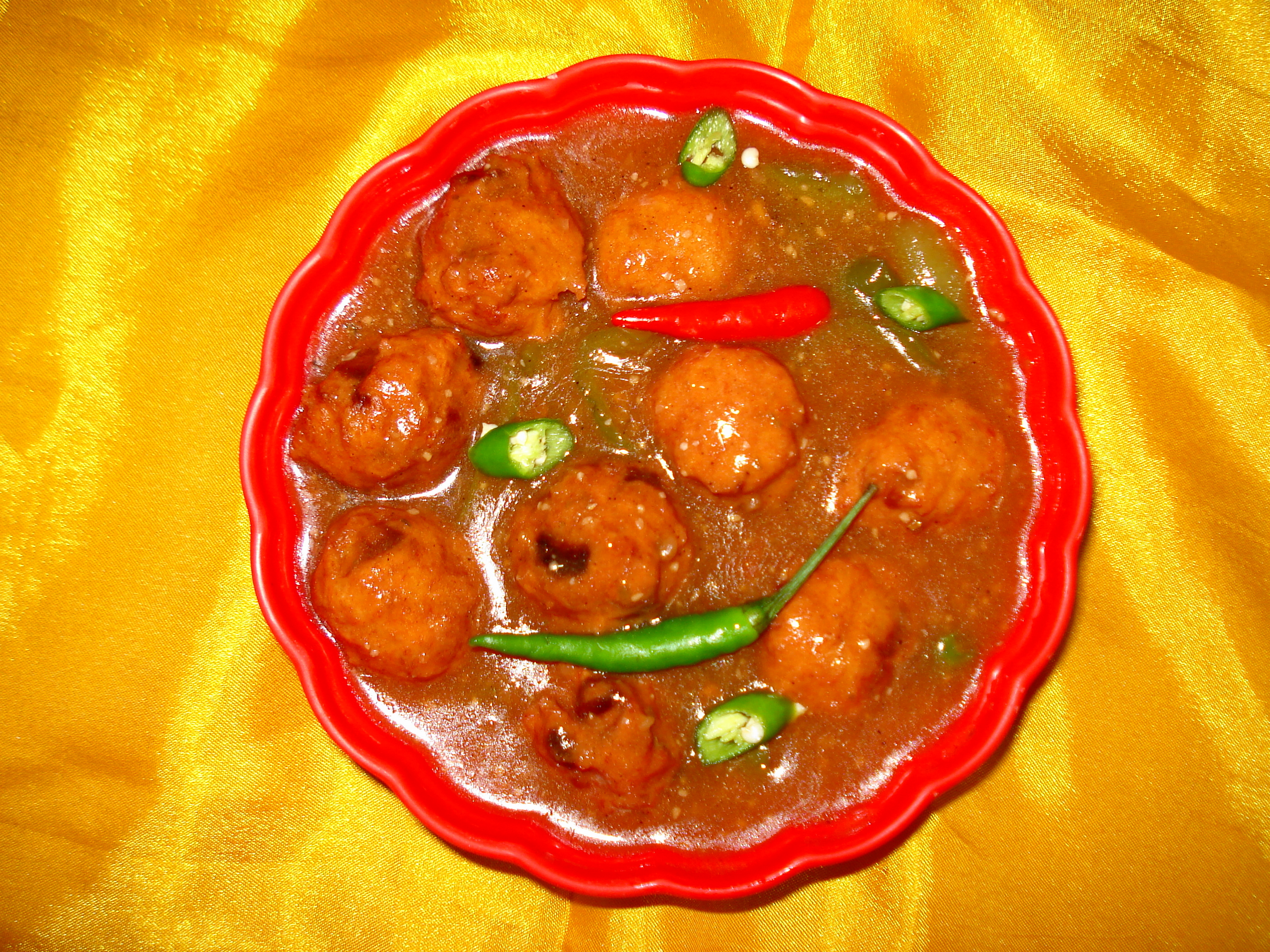
Chicken Manchurian with gravy

=== Dry or crispy Manchurian ===
The fritters are served comparatively dry, often as a snack or starter with tomato ketchup as dipping sauce. It is popular among alcohol drinkers as a bar snack, and has been described as "an excellent drinking companion to cold beer".

=== Manchurian with gravy ===
The fritters are coated with a thick sauce like spicy gravy curry made of corn flour. It is generally served with varieties of rice dishes like steamed rice, Chinese fried rice, or Sichuan fried rice, as the main course.

== See also ==
- China–India relations
  - Chindians
  - Historical and cultural relations between China and India
- List of deep-fried foods
- List of vegetable dishes
- Manchow soup
- Manchu cuisine
