= History of China–India relations =

Cultural and economic relations between China and India date back to ancient times. The Silk Road not only served as a major trade route between India and China, but is also credited for facilitating the spread of Buddhism from India to East Asia. During the 19th century, China was involved in a growing opium trade with the East India Company, which exported opium grown in India. During World War II, both India and the Republic of China (ROC) played a crucial role in halting the progress of Imperial Japan.

== Antiquity ==
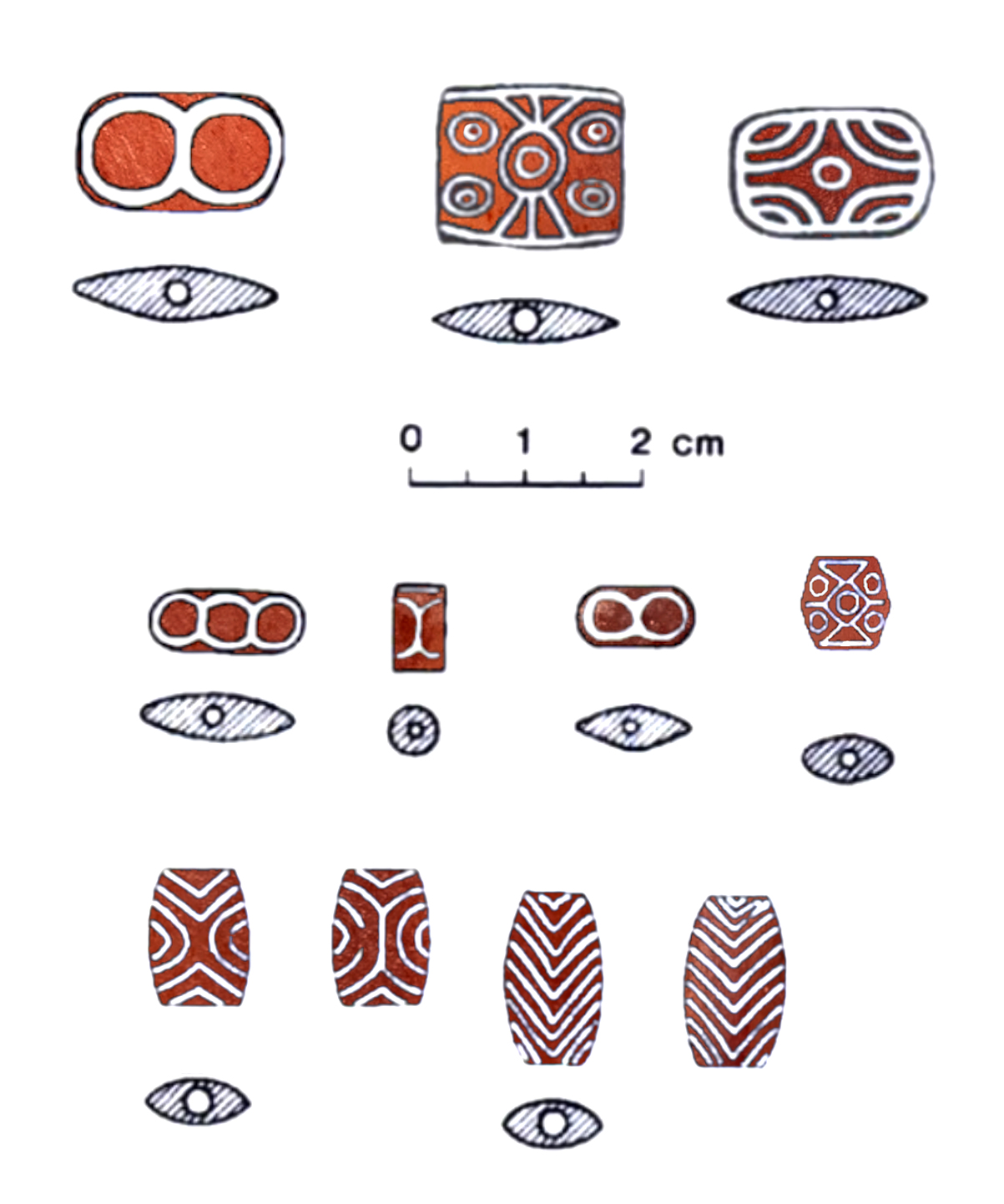
Etched carnelian beads, Harappa Culture. Such beads were imported from India to China in the early half of 1st millennium BCE.

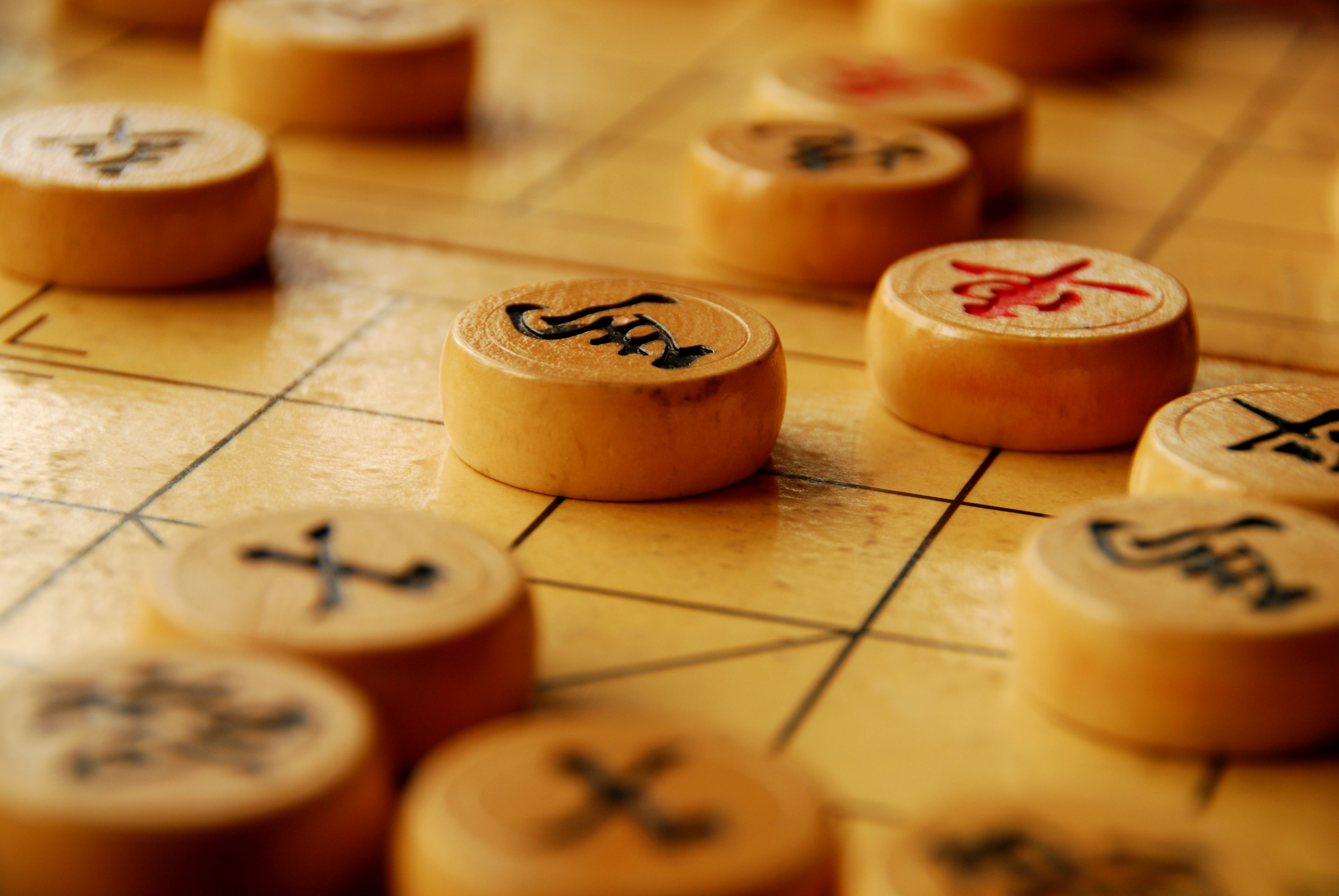
Xiangqi, or Chinese chess, which, like Western Chess is believed to be descended from the Indian chess game of chaturanga. The earliest indications reveal the game may have been played as early as the third century BCE.

Etched carnelian beads of Indus valley origin have been excavated from various archaeological sites in China dating from the Western Zhou and Spring and Autumn period (early half of 1st millennium BCE) to the Han and Jin dynasties, indicating early cultural exchanges.

China and India have also had some contact before the transmission of Buddhism. References to a people called the Chinas, are found in ancient Indian literature. The Indian epic Mahabharata (c. 5th century BCE) contains references to "China", which may have been referring to the Qin state which later became the Qin dynasty. Chanakya (c. 350–283 BCE), the prime minister of the Maurya Empire, refers to Chinese silk as "cinamsuka" (Chinese silk dress) and "cinapatta" (Chinese silk bundle) in his Arthashastra.

The first records of contact between China and India were written during the 2nd century BCE, especially following the expedition of Zhang Qian to Central Asia (138–114 BCE). Buddhism was transmitted from India to China in the 1st century CE. Trade relations via the Silk Road acted as economic contact between the two regions. In the Records of the Grand Historian, Zhang Qian (d. 113 BCE) and Sima Qian (145–90 BCE) make references to "Shendu", which may have been referring to the Indus Valley (the Sindh province in modern Pakistan), originally known as "Sindhu" in Sanskrit. When Yunnan was annexed by the Han dynasty in the 1st century, Chinese authorities reported an Indian "Shendu" community living there.

A Greco-Roman text Periplus of the Erythraean Sea (mid 1st century AD) describes the annual fair in present-day Northeast India, on the border with China.

Every year, there turns up at the border of Thina a certain tribe, short in body and very flat-faced ... called Sêsatai ... They come with their wives and children bearing great packs resembling mats of green leaves and then remain at some spot on the border between them and those on the Thina side, and they hold a festival for several days, spreading out the mats under them, and then take off for their own homes in the interior.

— Periplus, §65

== Early Middle Ages ==
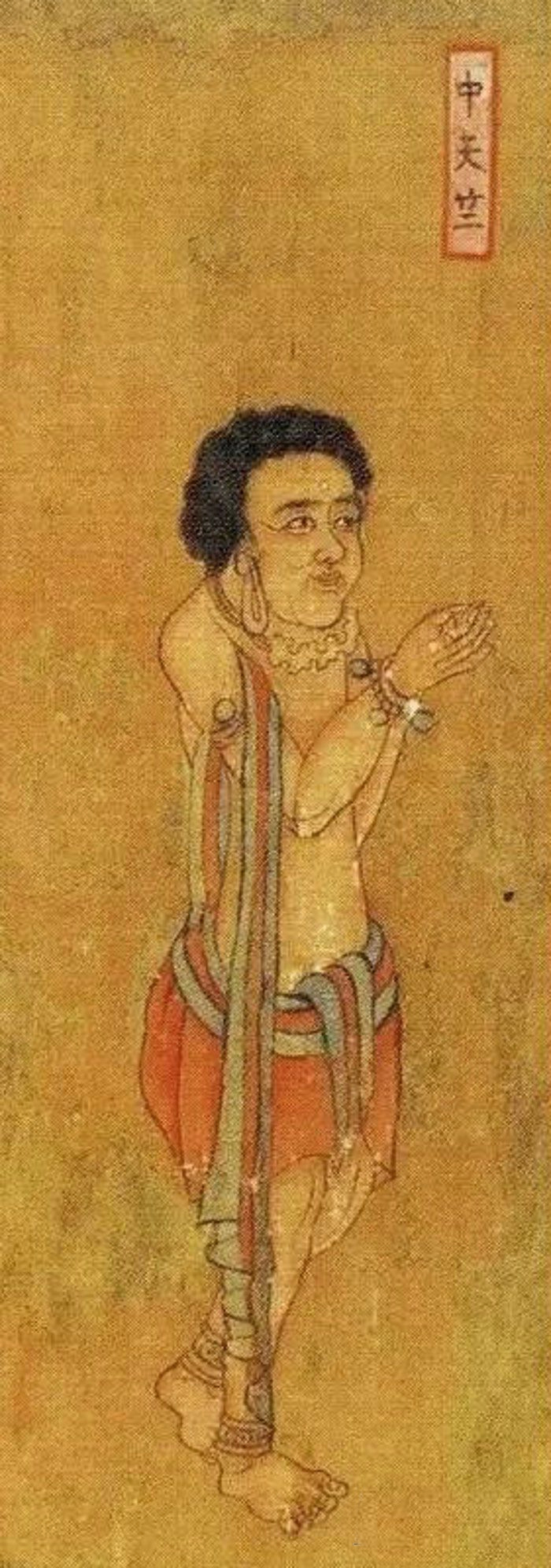
Ambassador from Central India (中天竺 Zhong Tianzhu) to the court of the Tang dynasty. Wanghuitu (王会图) circa 650 CE.

From the 1st century onwards, many Indian scholars and monks traveled to China, such as Batuo (fl. 464–495 CE)—first abbot of the Shaolin Monastery—and Bodhidharma—founder of Chan/Zen Buddhism—while many Chinese scholars and monks also traveled to India, such as Xuanzang (b. 604) and I Ching (635–713), both of whom were students at Nalanda University in Bihar. Xuanzang wrote the Great Tang Records on the Western Regions, an account of his journey to India, which later inspired Wu Cheng'en's Ming dynasty novel Journey to the West, one of the Four Great Classical Novels of Chinese literature. Hu Shih further suggested that Wu Cheng'en may have been influenced by the Hindu deity Hanuman from the Ramayana in his depictions of the Monkey King Sun Wukong from his novel. According to some, St. Thomas the Apostle travelled from India to China and back.

=== Chola Empire and Song dynasty ===
Chola Empire under Rajendra Chola c. 1030 C.E.

The Cholas, one of the three major Tamil kingdoms that ruled over the ancient Tamilakam region of India, maintained a good relationship with the Chinese. The first records of a relationship between the Chinese and Cholas dates back to second century BC. As per Ban Gu's work Book of Han (Ch'ien Han Shu), a Chinese ambassador was sent to the Chola Empire. He has also mentioned that he had seen many unprecedented objects which are unseen at China, at the city of kuvangtche. Berend, an acoustics expert, annotates that the city named by Ban Gu is analogous with the acity of Kanchi.

During the reign of the later Cholas such as Rajendra Chola I (1016–1033 CE) and Kulothunga Chola I (in 1077 CE), commercial and political diplomats were sent to China. Arrays of ancient Chinese coins have been found in the Cholas homeland (i.e. Thanjavur, Tiruvarur, and Pudukkottai districts of Tamil Nadu, India). Chinese coins have been found during excavations in parts of central Tamil Nadu such as Olayakkunnam and Thaalikkottai, which were part of the earlier Chola Empire.

Under Rajaraja Chola and his son Rajendra Chola, the Cholas had strong trading links with the Chinese Song dynasty. The Chola dynasty had strong influence over present-day Indonesia (Sri Vijaya Empire )

Many sources describe Bodhidharma, the founder of the Zen school of Buddhism in China, as a prince of the Pallava dynasty.

=== Tang and Harsha dynasties ===
During the 7th century, Tang dynasty gained control over large portions of the Silk Road and Central Asia. In 648 CE, the Chinese general Wang Xuance, along with thousands of recruited Tibetan mercenaries and Licchavis of Nepal, briefly invaded Kannauj in the Battle of Chabuheluo and took a reported Buddhist relic for China.

In the late 7th century, the Chinese monk Yijing, visited Magadha during the reign of Devagupta II (r. c. 680-700 CE) (Note: Not to be confused with Devagupta I (reign c. 601-605 CE)) and referred to him as the "King of Eastern India".

In the early 8th century, the Tang Empire sought military alliances to counter the expansion of the Tibetan Empire. Official Tang records like the Cefu Yuangui and the Old Book of Tang document that in 720 CE, Pallava monarch Narasimhavarman II (Rajasimha, r. 700–728 CE) sent an imperial embassy to the Tang capital of Luoyang. The Pallava king offered to deploy his state's military forces - specifically war elephants and armored infantry - to launch a joint campaign against Tibetan forces. Emperor Xuanzong (r. 712–756 CE) recognized the strategic value of this alliance and conferred upon Narasimhavarman II the title Che-li-lo-pai-ta-pan-ma (a Chinese phonetic transcription of Siri Narasimhavarman) and "King of the Kingdom of South India" (Nan Tianzhu Guowang). The Tang emperor also presented the Pallava ambassador with an imperial robe of honor and an official state seal.

During the 8th century, the astronomical table of sines by the Indian astronomer and mathematician, Aryabhatta (476–550), were translated into the Chinese astronomical and mathematical book of the Treatise on Astrology of the Kaiyuan Era (Kaiyuan Zhanjing), compiled in 718 CE during the Tang dynasty. The Kaiyuan Zhanjing was compiled by Gautama Siddha, an astronomer and astrologer born in Chang'an, and whose family was originally from India. He was also notable for his translation of the Navagraha calendar into Chinese.

Paper had already reached some parts of India as early as the 6th or 7th century, initially through Chinese travellers and the ancient silk road which India was very well connected with. Earlier some historians believed that paper failed to catch on as palmyra leaves and birch bark remained far more popular but this theory was discredited later on. On the other hand, the paper may have arrived in Bengal from a separate route, as the Chinese traveller Ma Huan remarked that Bengali paper was white and made from "bark of a tree" similar to the Chinese method of papermaking (as opposed to the Middle-Eastern method of using rags and waste material), suggesting a direct route from China for the arrival of paper in Bengal and paper was already very well established and widespread in that part of the subcontinent.

=== Yuan dynasty ===
A rich merchant from the Ma'bar Sultanate, Abu Ali (P'aehali) 孛哈里 (or 布哈爾 Buhaer), was associated closely with the Ma'bar royal family. After a fallout with the Ma'bar family, he moved to Yuan dynasty China and received a Korean woman as his wife and a job from the Emperor. The woman was formerly 桑哥 Sangha's wife and her father was 蔡仁揆 채송년 Ch'ae In'gyu during the reign of 忠烈 Chungnyeol of Goryeo, recorded in the Dongguk Tonggam, Goryeosa and 留夢炎 Liu Mengyan's 中俺集 Zhong'anji. 桑哥 Sangha was a Tibetan. Tamil Hindu Indian merchants traded in Quanzhou during the Yuan dynasty. Hindu statues were found in Quanzhou dating to this period.

In the 1330s, Muhammad bin Tughlaq of the Delhi Sultanate ordered an invasion of China, sending part of his forces over the Himalayas. (Note: According to Badauni and Ferishta) However, in 1333, Prithvi Chand II of the Kangra State defeated the army of Muhammad bin Tughluq which was not able to fight in the hills. There existed a direct trade relationship between China and the Delhi Sultanate. Ibn Battuta mentions that the king of China (the Yuan Emperor) had sent an embassy to Muhammad bin Tughluq for reconstruction of a sacked temple at Sambhal. The envoys were however denied with the statement that only those living in a Muslim territory who paid the jizya could be permitted to restore a temple.

== Late Middle Ages ==
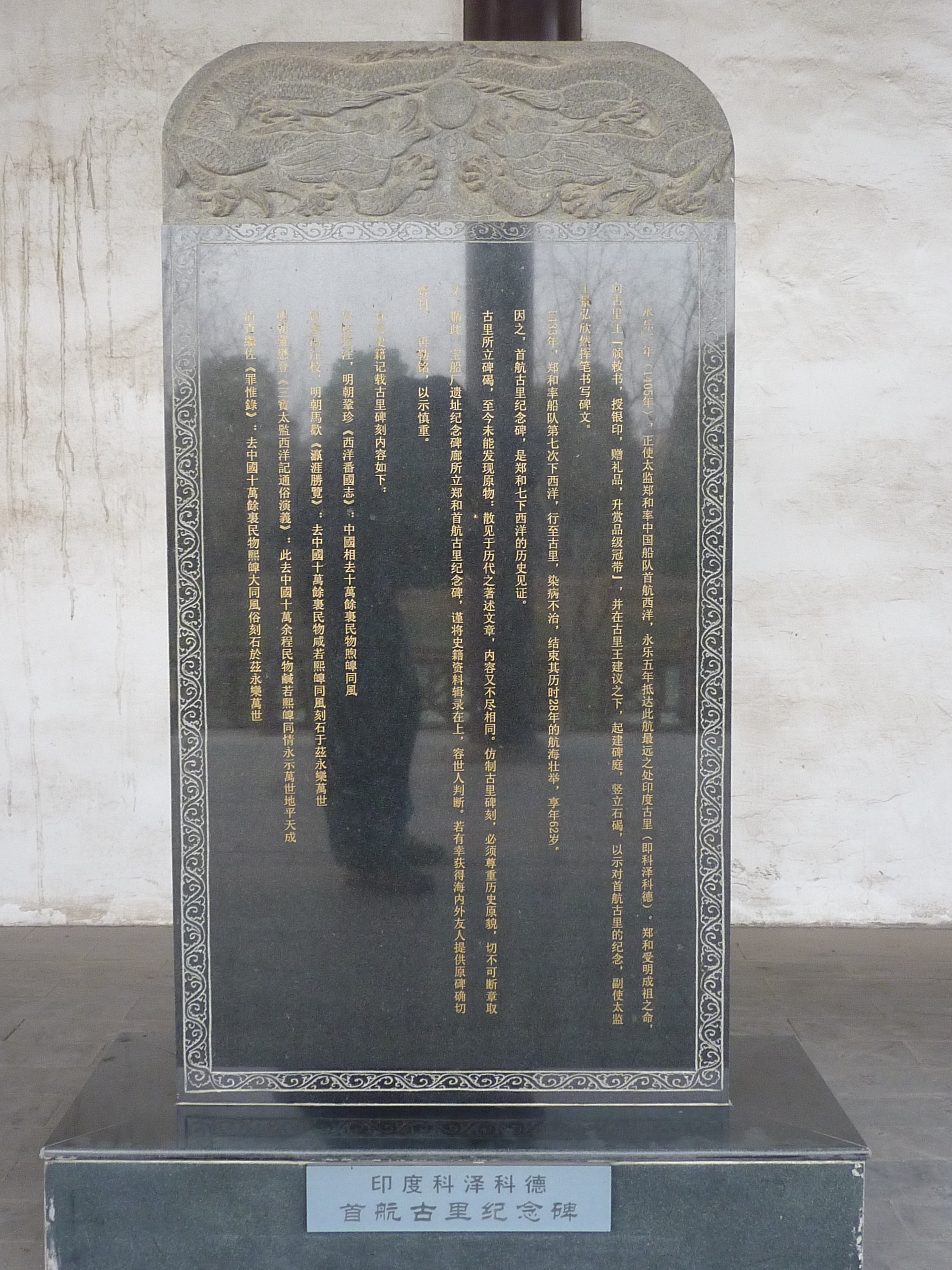
Stele installed in Calicut by Zheng He (modern replica)

Between 1405 and 1433, Ming dynasty China sponsored a series of seven naval expeditions led by Admiral Zheng He. Zheng He visited numerous Indian kingdoms and ports, including the Malabar coast, Bengal, and Ceylon, the Persian Gulf, Arabia, and later expeditions ventured down as far as Malindi in what is now Kenya. Throughout his travels, Zheng He liberally dispensed Chinese gifts of silk, porcelain, and other goods. In return, he received rich and unusual presents, including African zebras and giraffes. Zheng He and his company paid respect to local deities and customs, and in Ceylon, they erected a monument (Galle Trilingual Inscription) honouring Buddha, Allah, and Vishnu. Bengal sent twelve diplomatic missions to Nanjing between 1405 and 1439.

After the Ming treasure voyages, private Chinese traders continued operating in the eastern Indian Ocean. Chinese junks could frequently be seen in the ports of the Vijayanagara Empire, carrying silks and other products. The ports of Mangalore, Honavar, Bhatkal, Barkur, Cochin, Cannanore, Machilipatnam, and Dharmadam were important, for they provided secure harbors for traders from China. On the other hand, Vijayanagara exports to China intensified and included cotton, spices, jewels, semi-precious stones, ivory, rhino horn, ebony, amber, coral, and aromatic products such as perfumes.

The Mughals may have attempted to reach the Chinese market. According to East India Company official William Hawkins, Emperor Jahangir's wardrobe master was ordered to replace a valuable porcelain. To fulfill the task, the wardrobe master traveled to China but found nothing of equivalent value.

== Early Modern ==
The Bhois of Orissa maintained minor maritime trade links with China. This is noted from the Manchu language memorials and edicts depicting contacts under the reign of the Qing dynasty in China, when the Qianlong Emperor received a gift from the Brahmin (Ch. Polomen 婆羅門, Ma. Bolomen) envoy of a ruler whose Manchu name was Birakišora han of Utg’ali (Ch. Wutegali bilaqishila han 烏特噶里畢拉奇碩拉汗), who is described as a ruler in Eastern India. Hence, referring to Birakisore Deva I of Khurda (1736–1793) who styled himself as Gajapati, the ruler of Utkala. Many of the gosains entering Tibet from China passed through his territory when visiting the Jagannath temple at Puri.

The reign of Tipu Sultan in Mysore saw Chinese technology used for sugar production, and sandalwood was exported to China. Tipu's and Mysore's tryst with silk began in the early 1780s when he received an ambassador from the Qing dynasty-ruled China at his court. The ambassador presented him with a silk cloth. Tipu was said to be enchanted by the item to such an extent that he resolved to introduce its production in his kingdom. He sent a return journey to China, which returned after twelve years.

After the Qing expansion into the Himalayas, there was increased contact with South Asia, which often manifested in the form of tributary relations. The Qing were obliged to defend their subservient state, Badakhshan, against the Afghans and Marathas, though no major clash with the Marathas ever took place. The Afghans gained the initiative and defeated the Marathas at Panipat in 1761. The battle's outcome was used by the Afghans to intimidate the Qing.

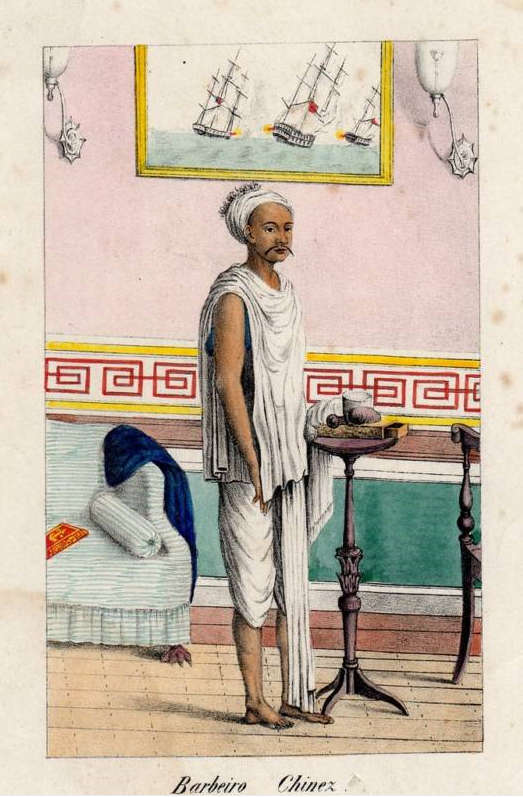
A Chinese barber in Goa, early 1800s

=== Sino-Sikh War ===
In the 18th to 19th centuries, the Sikh Empire expanded into neighbouring lands. It had annexed Ladakh into the state of Jammu in 1834. In 1841, they invaded Tibet and overran parts of western Tibet. Chinese forces defeated the Sikh army in December 1841, forcing the Sikh army to withdraw, and in turn, entered Ladakh and besieged Leh, where they were, in turn, defeated by the Sikh Army. At this point, neither side wished to continue the conflict, as the Sikhs were embroiled in tensions with the British that would lead up to the First Anglo-Sikh War, while the Chinese were in the midst of the First Opium War. The Sikhs claimed victory. The two parties signed a treaty in September 1842, which stipulated no transgressions or interference in the other country's frontiers.

=== British Raj ===
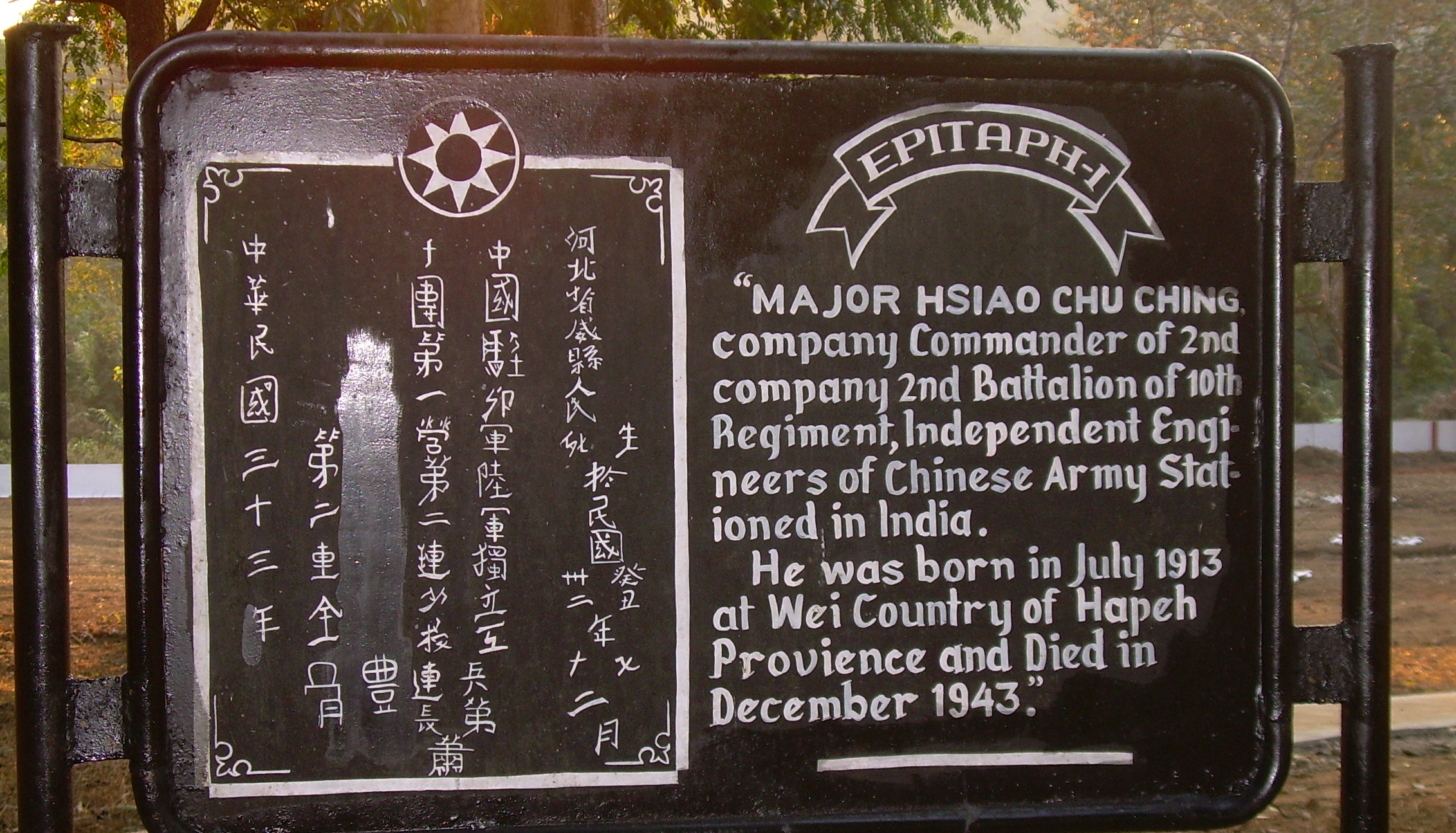
Epitaph of Major Hsiao Chu Ching at Jairampur cemetery

Indian soldiers, known as "sepoys", who were in British service participated in the First and Second Opium Wars against Qing China. Indian sepoys were also involved in the suppression of the Boxer Rebellion in 1900, in addition to serving as guards in the British colony of Hong Kong and foreign concessions such as the Shanghai International Settlement. The Chinese slur "Yindu A San " (印度阿三 - Indian number three) was used to describe Indian soldiers in British service, with some of the popular sentiment rejecting the possibility for Sino-Indian fraternity.

== Modern ==
China–India relations
- China: India

Hu Shih, the Chinese ambassador to the United States from 1938 to 1942, commented, albeit critically, on India's Buddhism almost completely subsuming Chinese society upon its introduction.

ASIA is one. The Himalayas divide, only to accentuate, two mighty civilizations, the Chinese with its communism of Confucius, and the Indian with its individualism of the Vedas. But not even the snowy barriers can interrupt for one moment that broad expanse of love for the Ultimate and Universal, which is the common thought-inheritance of every Asiatic race, enabling them to produce all the great religions of the world and distinguishing them from those maritime peoples of the Mediterranean and the Baltic, who love to dwell on the Particular, and to search out the means, not the end, of life.

While never having actually visited India in his lifetime, Sun Yat-sen, founder of the Republic of China, occasionally spoke and wrote of India as a fellow Asian nation that was likewise subject to harsh Western exploitation, and frequently called for a Pan-Asian united front against all unjust imperialism. In a 1921 speech, Sun stated: "The Indians have long been oppressed by the British. They have now reacted with a change in their revolutionary thinking...There is progress in their revolutionary spirit, they will not be cowed down by Britain." To this day, there is a prominent street named Sun Yat-sen street in an old Chinatown in Calcutta, now known as Kolkata.

In 1924, on his major tour of several major Chinese cities, giving lectures about using their shared Asian values and traditional spirituality to help together promote world peace, Rabindranath Tagore was invited to Canton by Sun Yat-sen, an invitation which he declined. There was considerably mixed reception to Tagore from the Chinese students and intellectuals. For example, a major Buddhist association in Shanghai stated that for seven hundred years, they had "waited for a message from India", while others, mostly modernizers and communists, outright rejected his ideals, stating that they did not "want philosophy, we want materialism" and "not wisdom, but power".

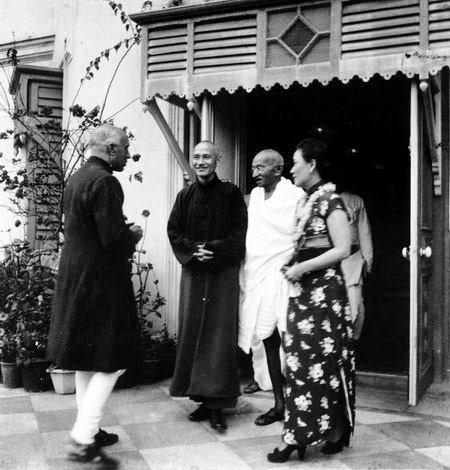
Chiang Kai-shek and his wife Song Meiling with Mahatma Gandhi and Jawaharlal Nehru

Believing that then-Republican China and British India were "sister nations from the dawn of history" who needed to transform their "ancient friendship into a new camaraderie of two freedom-loving nations", Jawaharlal Nehru visited China in 1939 as an honored guest of the government. Highly praising both Chiang Kai-shek and his wife Song Meiling, Nehru referred to Chiang as "not only a great Chinese, but a great Asiatic and world figure...one of the top most leaders of the world...a successful general and captain in war", and Song as "full of vitality and charm...a star hope for the Chinese people...a symbol of China's invincibility". During his visit, Chiang and Nehru shared a bunker one night when Japanese bombers attacked Chongqing in late August, with Chiang recording a favorable impression of Nehru in his diary; the Chiangs also regularly wrote Nehru during his time in prison and even after their 1942 visit to India.

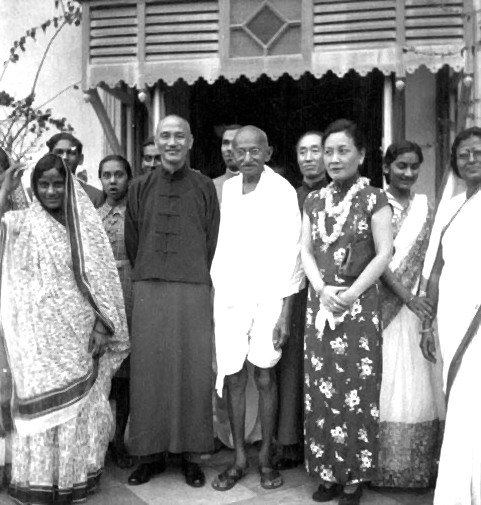
The Chiangs with Mahatma Gandhi in Calcutta in 1942

Partially to enlist India's aid against both Japanese and Western imperialism in exchange for China's support for Indian independence, the Chiangs visited British India in 1942 and met with Nehru, Mahatma Gandhi, and Muhammad Ali Jinnah. The Chiangs also sought to present their nation as a potential third option for the Indian people to ally themselves with, with public sympathies at the time sharply split between the British and the Japanese, who actively tried to sway India's population with pledges to liberate Asia if they would help their efforts against the British. Despite pledges of mutual friendship and future cooperation between the two peoples, Chiang argued that, while Gandhi's non-violent resistance was not necessarily invalid for the Indian people, it was an unrealistic worldview on a global context. Gandhi, who had at the time insisted on India refraining from participating in any war unless India was first given complete independence, in turn, later noted that, although "fun was had by all...I would not say that I had learnt anything, and there was nothing that we could teach him." In their meeting in Calcutta, Jinnah tried to persuade Chiang, who had pressed Britain to relinquish India as soon as possible, of the necessity of establishing a separate nation for Muslims in the subcontinent, to which Chiang, who apparently recognized the Indian National Congress as the sole nationalist force in the country, replied that if ten crores of Muslims could live peacefully with other communities in China, then there was no true necessity as he saw it of a separate state for a smaller population of nine crores of Muslims living in India. While the public reception to the Chiangs was mostly positive, some reacted less favorably to the Chiangs' presence in India, with Jinnah believing that Chiang Kai-shek lacked proper understanding of Indian society and feeling he was biased in favor of Nehru and Gandhi while neglecting the demands of other religious communities, with his newspaper Dawn calling him a "meddlesome marshal", while other Indian Muslims, such as Muhammad Zafarullah Khan, expressed mistrust for the couple's motives, believing that their government wanted to eventually expand its influence to Indochina and the subcontinent after the British departure.

For his part, Chiang apparently believed none of the major Indian leaders could help his government meaningfully. As an ardent nationalist who lived through China's internally turbulent years, he felt that Jinnah was "dishonest" and was being used by the British to divide the peoples of India and, by extension, Asia, with he and his wife Song believing that cooperation between Indian religious communities was difficult but possible. At the same time, he also felt genuinely disappointed by Gandhi, with whom he initially had high expectations, and noted afterwards that "he knows and loves only India, and doesn't care about other places and peoples". Having been unable to make Gandhi change his views about satyagraha, even after arguing that some of their enemies, such as the Japanese, would make the preaching of non-violence impossible, Chiang, himself raised a Buddhist, blamed "traditional Indian philosophy" for his sole focus on endurance of suffering rather than revolutionary zeal necessary to rally and unite the Asian peoples. Nevertheless, the Chiangs continued to commit themselves to supporting the Indian independence movement from afar, mostly via diplomacy, with Song Meiling writing to Nehru encouragingly: "We shall leave nothing undone in assisting you to gain freedom and independence. Our hearts are drawn to you, and...the bond of affection between you and us has been strengthened by our visit....When you are discouraged and weary...remember that you are not alone in your struggle, for at all times we are with you in spirit."

Although their meetings had ended on a positive note, with Gandhi offering to adopt Song as a "daughter" in his ashram if Chiang left her there as his ambassador to India after she asked to be taught about his non-violent principles, and giving her his spinning wheel as a farewell gift, both sides were met with considerable obstacles in the aftermath. After the Chiangs tried to seek U.S. President Franklin Roosevelt's help in persuading Winston Churchill to give India independence during the war, Roosevelt suggested splitting India's territory in two in the hopes of resolving tensions, to which Song replied that both she and Chiang felt that "India was as indivisible as China". Gandhi wrote to Chiang shortly afterwards, seeking to clarify his stance: "I need hardly give you my assurance that, as the author of the new move in India, I shall take no hasty action. And whatever action I may recommend will be governed by the consideration that it should not injure China, or encourage Japanese aggression. I am trying to enlist world opinion in favor of a proposition which to me appears self-proved and which must lead to the strengthening of India and China's defence." Chiang sent a cable to Washington upon reading Gandhi's letter, and advised Roosevelt that the best course of action would be to "restore complete freedom" to India, but Churchill reportedly threatened to end Britain's alliance with China should the Chiangs continue to try to interfere with Indian affairs.

In 1942, a division of the Kuomintang's armies entered India as the Chinese Army in India in their struggle against Japanese expansion in Southeast Asia. Dwarkanath Kotnis and four other Indian physicians traveled to war-torn China to provide medical assistance against the Imperial Japanese Army.
