= Chicken lollipop =

Indian fried chicken appetizer

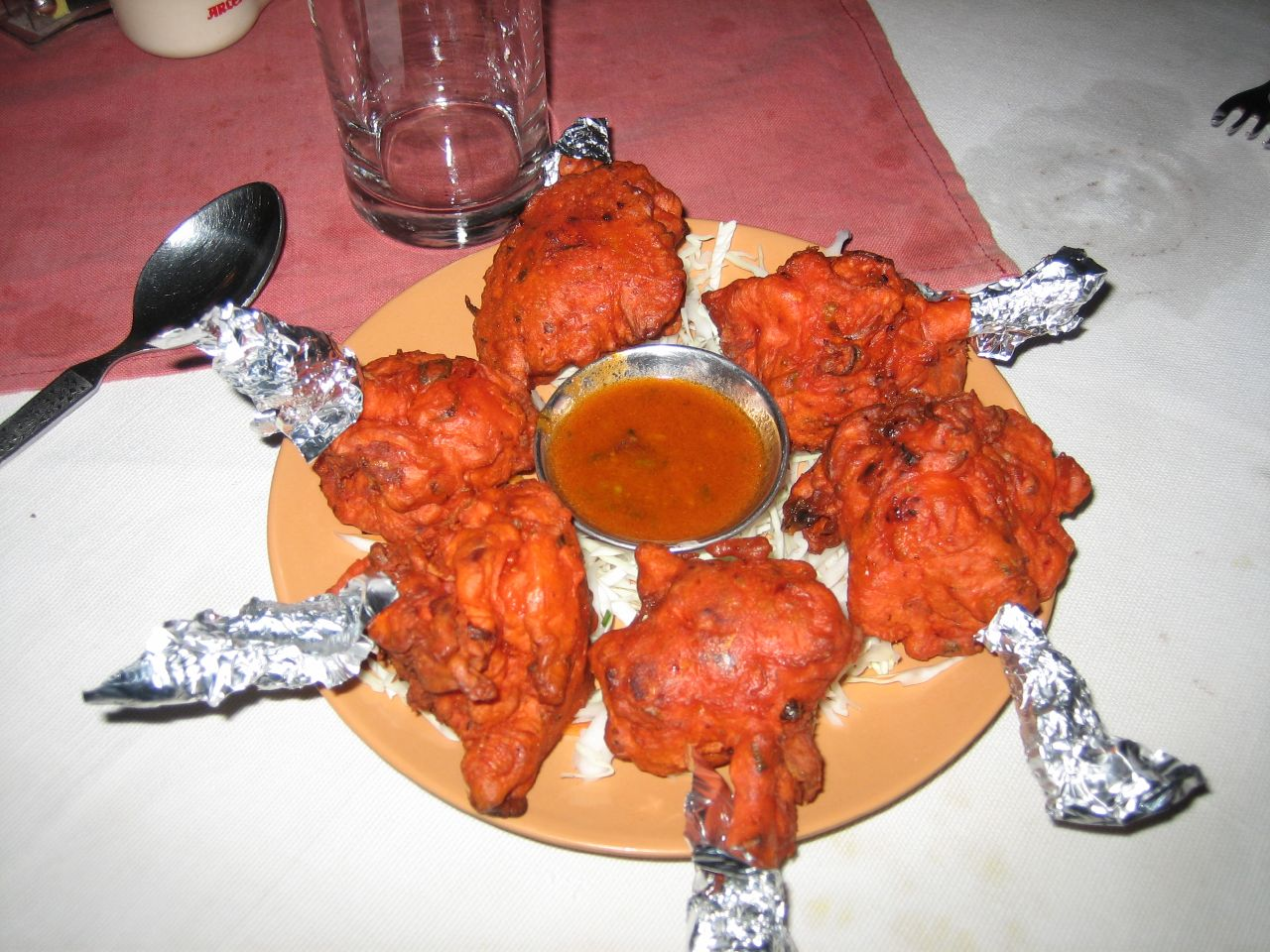
- A platter of chicken lollipops, with spicy dipping sauce, served in Goa, India
- Type: Starter
- Course: Hors d'oeuvre
- Place of origin: India
- Associated cuisine: Indian
- Serving temperature: Hot
- Main ingredients: Chicken wings, batter
- Variations: Mutton lollipop

Chicken lollipop is a popular Indian fried chicken appetiser. Chicken lollipop is essentially a frenched chicken winglet, wherein the meat is cut loose from the bone end and pushed down, creating a lollipop appearance.

== Recipe ==
Recipes vary at different restaurants. However, many start by using the middle segment of the chicken wing or thigh. The middle segment has one of the two bones removed, and the flesh on the segments is pushed to one end of the bone. These are then coated in a spicy red batter whose main ingredients include red chili powder, and turmeric. The coated chicken is then marinated for a couple of hours. The marinated chicken is usually deep fried in oil, but another choice is baking the chicken. The exposed bone is sometimes wrapped in aluminum foil. In a variation named Drums of Heaven, the fried lollipops are tossed in a sweet and spicy sauce.

== See also ==
- List of hors d'oeuvre
- Buffalo wing
- Swiss wing
