= List of Indian inventions and discoveries =

Indian inventions

This list of Indian inventions and discoveries details the inventions, scientific discoveries and contributions of India, including those from the historic Indian subcontinent and the modern-day Republic of India. It draws from the whole cultural and technological of India|cartography, metallurgy, logic, mathematics, metrology and mineralogy were among the branches of study pursued by its scholars. During recent times science and technology in the Republic of India has also focused on automobile engineering, information technology, communications as well as research into space and polar technology.

For the purpose of this list, the inventions are regarded as technological firsts developed within the territory of India. As such, this list does not include foreign technologies which India acquired through contact, any breakthroughs in a foreign land by a person of Indian origin living in a foreign country, a new idea, indigenous alternatives, low-cost alternatives, or technologies or discoveries developed elsewhere and later invented separately in India, nor inventions by Indian emigres or the Indian diaspora in other places. Changes in minor concepts of design or style and artistic innovations do not appear in the lists.

== Ancient India ==
=== Arts ===
==== Martial arts ====
- Kalaripayattu – One of the world's oldest form of martial arts is Kalaripayattu that developed in the southwest state of Kerala in India.
- Vajra-mushti – refers to a wrestling where knuckleduster like weapon is employed.The first literary mention of vajra-musti comes from the Manasollasa of the Chalukya king Someswara III (1124–1138), although it has been conjectured to have existed since as early as the Maurya dynasty

=== Agriculture ===
- Indigo dye – Indigo, a blue pigment and a dye, was used in India, which was also the earliest major, old world, centre for its production and processing. The Indigofera tinctoria variety of Indigo was domesticated in India. Indigo, used as a dye, made its way to the Greeks and the Romans via various trade routes, and was valued as a luxury product.
- Jute cultivation – Jute has been cultivated in India since ancient times. Raw jute was exported to the western world, where it was used to make ropes and cordage. The Indian jute industry, in turn, was modernised during the British Raj in India. The region of Bengal was the major centre for Jute cultivation, and remained so before the modernisation of India's jute industry in 1855, when Kolkata became a centre for jute processing in India.
- Sugar – Sugarcane was originally from tropical South Asia and Southeast Asia, with different species originating in India, and S. edule and S. officinarum from New Guinea. The process of producing crystallised sugar from sugar cane, in India, dates to at least the beginning of the common era, with 1st century CE Greek and Roman authors writing on Indian sugar. The process was soon transmitted to China with travelling Buddhist monks. Chinese documents confirm at least two missions to India, initiated in 647 CE, for obtaining technology for sugar-refining. Each mission returned with results on refining sugar.

=== Construction, civil engineering and architecture ===
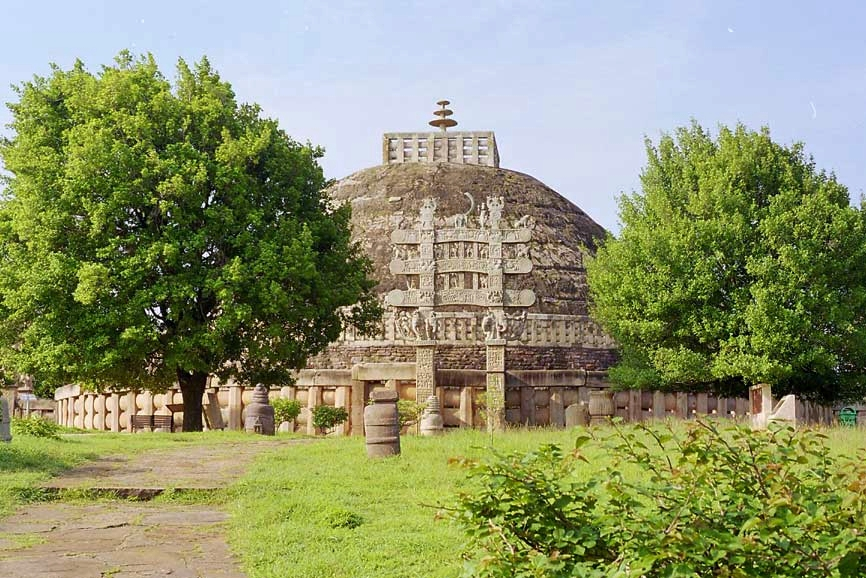
The Great Stupa at Sanchi (4th–1st century BCE). The dome shaped stupa was used in India as a commemorative monument associated with storing sacred relics.

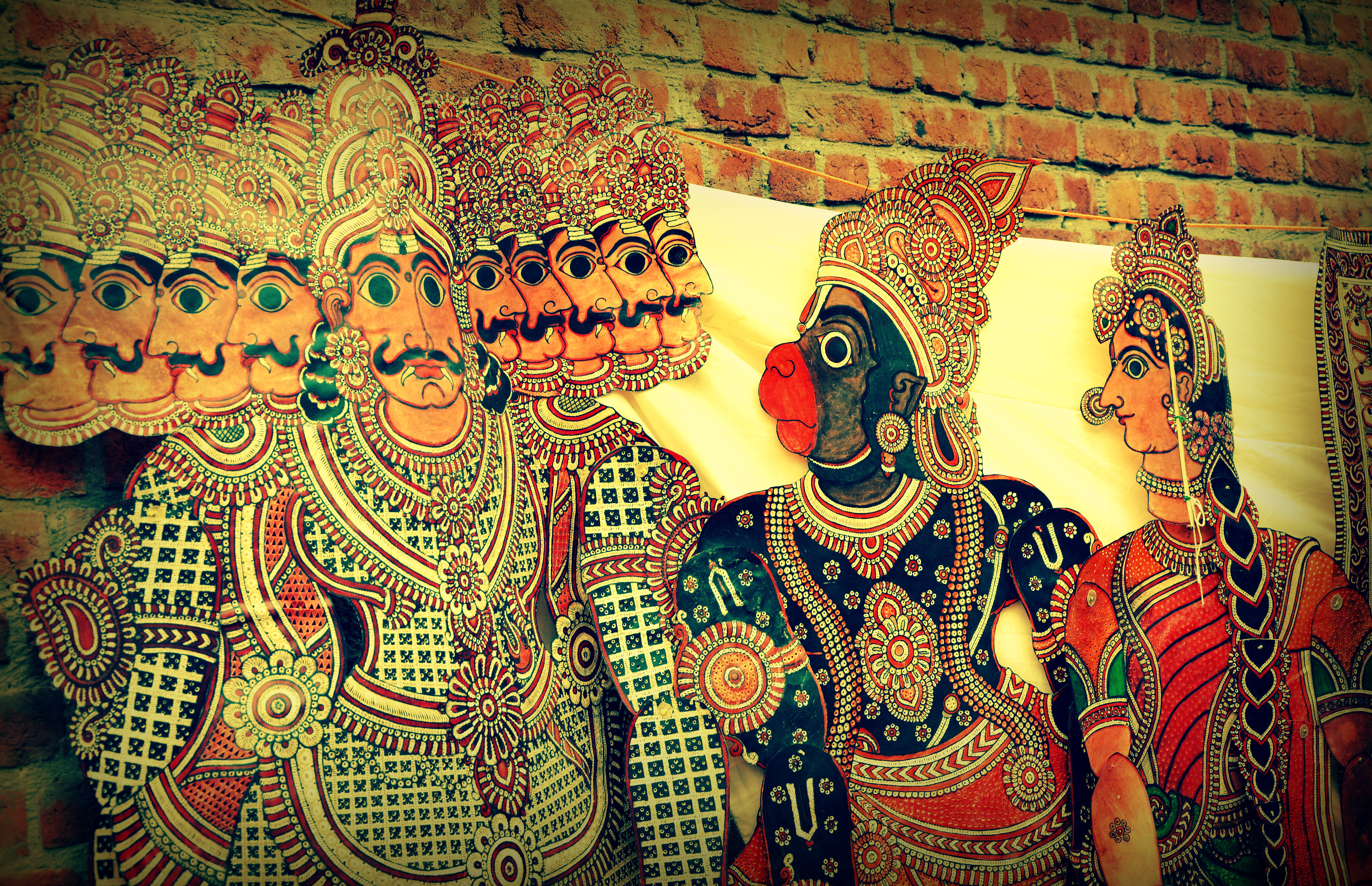
Hanuman and Ravana in Tolu Bommalata, the shadow puppet tradition of Andhra Pradesh, India

- Stepwell – While the early history of stepwells is poorly understood, water structures in Western India were their likely predecessor. The three features of stepwells in the subcontinent are evident from one particular site, abandoned by 2500 BCE, which combines a bathing pool, steps leading down to water, and figures of some religious importance into one structure.
- Stupa – The origin of the stupa can be traced to 3rd-century BCE India. It was used as a commemorative monument associated with storing sacred relics. The stupa architecture was adopted in Southeast and East Asia, where it evolved into the pagoda, a Buddhist monument used for enshrining sacred relics.
- Residential University – Nalanda (Nālandā, pronounced [naːlən̪d̪aː]) was a renowned mahavihara (Buddhist monastic university) in ancient Magadha (modern-day Bihar), eastern India. Considered by historians to be the world's first residential university and among the greatest centres of learning in the ancient world, it was located near the city of Rajagriha (now Rajgir) and about 90 kilometres (56 mi) southeast of Pataliputra (now Patna) and operated from 427 until 1197 CE.

=== Finance and banking ===
- Cheque/Check – There is early evidence of using cheques/checks. In India, during the Maurya Empire (from 321 to 185 BC), a commercial instrument called the "Adesha" was in use, which was an order on a banker desiring him to pay the money of the note to a third person (now known as or referred to as a "Negotiable Instrument").

=== Games ===
- Atya-patya – This variation of tag was being played as early as 100 CE, and was possibly invented by farmers as a way of practicing driving away birds. It was later used as a form of military training in Kerala in close relation to the martial art of kalaripayattu.
- Blindfold chess – Games prohibited by Buddha includes a variant of ashtapada game played on imaginary boards. Akasam astapadam was an ashtapada variant played with no board, literally "astapadam played in the sky". A correspondent in the American Chess Bulletin identifies this as likely the earliest literary mention of a blindfold chess variant.
- Carrom – The game of carrom originated in India. One carrom board with its surface made of glass is still available in one of the palaces in Patiala, India. It became very popular among the masses after World War I. State-level competitions were being held in the different states of India during the early part of the twentieth century. Serious carrom tournaments may have begun in Sri Lanka in 1935 but by 1958, both India and Sri Lanka had formed official federations of carrom clubs, sponsoring tournaments and awarding prizes.
- Chaturanga – The precursor of chess originated in India during the Gupta dynasty (c. 280–550 CE). Both the Persians and Arabs ascribe the origins of the game of Chess to the Indians. The words for "chess" in Old Persian and Arabic are chatrang and shatranj respectively – terms derived from caturaṅga in Sanskrit, which literally means an army of four divisions or four corps. Chess spread throughout the world and many variants of the game soon began taking shape. This game was introduced to the Near East from India and became a part of the princely or courtly education of Persian nobility. Buddhist pilgrims, Silk Road traders and others carried it to the Far East where it was transformed and assimilated into a game often played on the intersection of the lines of the board rather than within the squares. Chaturanga reached Europe through Persia, the Byzantine empire and the expanding Arabian empire. Muslims carried Shatranj to North Africa, Sicily, and Spain by the 10th century where it took its final modern form of chess.
- Gillidanda- It is a game where players attempt to hit a stick as far as possible to score points. It has similarities to the traditional games around the world, such as tipcat.
- Kabaddi – The game of kabaddi originated in India during prehistory. Suggestions on how it evolved into the modern form range from wrestling exercises, military drills, and collective self-defence but most authorities agree that the game existed in some form or the other in India during the period between 1500 and 400 BCE.
- Kho-kho – This is one of the oldest variations of tag in the world, having been played since as early as the fourth century BCE.
- Ludo – Pachisi originated in India by the 6th century. The earliest evidence of this game in India is the depiction of boards on the caves of Ajanta. A variant of this game, called Ludo, made its way to England during the British Raj.
- Mallakhamba – It is a traditional sport, originating from the Indian subcontinent, in which a gymnast performs aerial yoga or gymnastic postures and wrestling grips in concert with a vertical stationary or hanging wooden pole, cane, or rope.The earliest literary known mention of Mallakhamb is in the 1135 CE Sanskrit classic Manasollasa, written by Someshvara III. It has been thought to be the ancestor of Pole Dancing.
- Nuntaa, also known as Kutkute.
- Seven stones – An Indian subcontinent game also called Pitthu is played in rural areas has its origins in the Indus Valley Civilization.
- Snakes and ladders – Vaikunta pali Snakes and ladders originated in India as a game based on morality. During British rule of India, this game made its way to England, and was eventually introduced in the United States of America by game-pioneer Milton Bradley in 1943.
- Suits game: Kridapatram is an early suits game, made of painted rags, invented in Ancient India. The term kridapatram literally means "painted rags for playing." Paper playing cards first appeared in East Asia during the 9th century. The medieval Indian game of ganjifa, or playing cards, is first recorded in the 16th century.

=== Textile and material production ===
- Button – Ornamental buttons—made from seashell—were used in the Indus Valley civilization for ornamental purposes by 2000 BCE. Some buttons were carved into geometric shapes and had holes pierced into them so that they could be attached to clothing by using a thread. Ian McNeil (1990) holds that: "The button, in fact, was originally used more as an ornament than as a fastening, the earliest known being found at Mohenjo-daro in the Indus Valley. It is made of a curved shell and about 5000 years old."

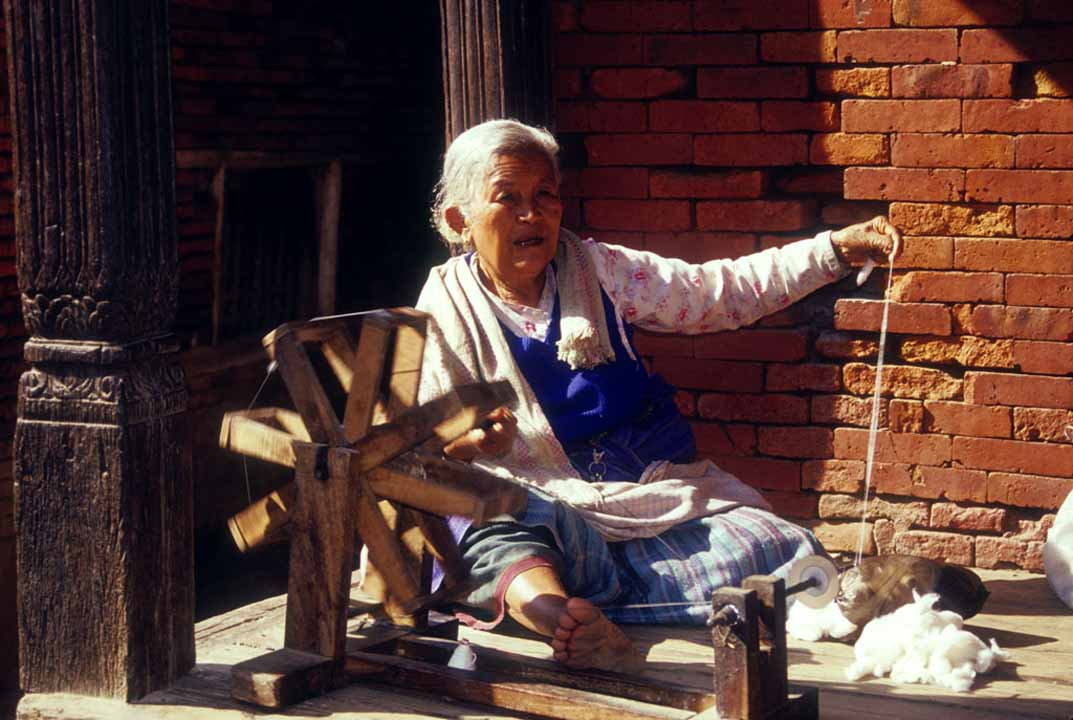
A Nepali Charkha in action

- Calico – Calico had originated in the subcontinent by the 11th century and found mention in Indian literature, by the 12th-century writer Hemachandra. He has mentioned calico fabric prints done in a lotus design. The Indian textile merchants traded in calico with the Africans by the 15th century and calico fabrics from Gujarat appeared in Egypt. Trade with Europe followed from the 17th century onward. Within India, calico originated in Kozhikode.
- Carding devices – Historian of science Joseph Needham ascribes the invention of bow-instruments used in textile technology to India. The earliest evidence for using bow-instruments for carding comes from India (2nd century CE). These carding devices, called kaman and dhunaki would loosen the texture of the fibre by the means of a vibrating string.
- Cashmere – The fibre cashmere fibre also known as pashm or pashmina for its use in the handmade shawls of Kashmir, India. The woolen shawls made from wool in Indian administered Kashmir find written mention between the 3rd century BCE and the 11th century CE.
- Charkha (Spinning wheel): invented in India, between 500 and 1000 CE.
- Chintz – The origin of Chintz is from the printed all cotton fabric of calico in India. The origin of the word chintz itself is from the Hindi language word चित्र् (chitr), which means an image.
- Cotton cultivation – Cotton was cultivated by the inhabitants of the Indus Valley civilisation by the 5th millennium BCE – 4th millennium BCE. The Indus cotton industry was well developed and some methods used in cotton spinning and fabrication continued to be practised until the modern industrialisation of India. Well before the Common Era, the use of cotton textiles had spread from India to the Mediterranean and beyond.
- Single roller cotton gin – The Ajanta Caves of India yield evidence of a single roller cotton gin in use by the 5th century. This cotton gin was used in India until innovations were made in form of foot powered gins. The cotton gin was invented in India as a mechanical device known as charkhi, more technically the "wooden-worm-worked roller". This mechanical device was, in some parts of India, driven by water power.
- Worm drive cotton gin – The worm drive later appeared in the Indian subcontinent, for use in roller cotton gins, during the Delhi Sultanate in the thirteenth or fourteenth centuries.
- Crank Handle Cotton Gin – The incorporation of the crank handle in the cotton gin, first appeared in either the late Delhi Sultanate or the early Mughal Empire (15-16th century CE).
- Palampore – पालमपोर् (Hindi language) of Indian origin was imported to the western world—notable England and Colonial America—from India. In 17th-century England these hand painted cotton fabrics influenced native crewel work design. Shipping vessels from India also took palampore to colonial America, where it was used in quilting.
- Prayer flags – The Buddhist sūtras, written on cloth in India, were transmitted to other regions of the world. These sutras, written on banners, were the origin of prayer flags. Legend ascribes the origin of the prayer flag to the Shakyamuni Buddha, whose prayers were written on battle flags used by the devas against their adversaries, the asuras. The legend may have given the Indian bhikku a reason for carrying the 'heavenly' banner as a way of signyfying his commitment to ahimsa. This knowledge was carried into Tibet by 800 CE, and the actual flags were introduced no later than 1040 CE, where they were further modified. The Indian monk Atisha (980–1054 CE) introduced the Indian practice of printing on cloth prayer flags to Tibet.
- Shellac - a biopolymer resin that is secreted by an insect called lac bug onto tree trunks, it has multiple uses such as wood polishing, drug coating, candies etc. its name is derived from lakh word.
- Roller sugar mill – Geared sugar rolling mills first appeared in Mughal India, using the principle of rollers as well as worm gearing, by the 17th century.

=== Well-being ===
- Indian clubs: The Indian club—which appeared in Europe during the 18th century—was used long by India's native soldiery before its introduction to Europe. During the British Raj the British officers in India performed calisthenic exercises with clubs to keep in physical condition. From Britain the use of club swinging spread to the rest of the world.
- Shampoo – The word shampoo in English is derived from Hindustani cā̃po (चाँपो IPA: [tʃãːpoː]), and dates to 1762. A variety of herbs and their extracts were used as shampoos since ancient times in India, evidence of early herbal shampoo have been discovered from Indus Valley Civilization site of Banawali dated to 2750–2500 BCE. A very effective early shampoo was made by boiling Sapindus with dried Indian gooseberry (aamla) and a few other herbs, using the strained extract. Sapindus, also known as soapberries or soapnuts, is called Ksuna (Sanskrit: क्षुण) in ancient Indian texts and its fruit pulp contain saponins, a natural surfactant. The extract of Ksuna, creates a lather which Indian texts identify as phenaka (Sanskrit: फेनक), leaves the hair soft, shiny and manageable. Other products used for hair cleansing were shikakai (Acacia concinna), soapnuts (Sapindus), hibiscus flowers, ritha (Sapindus mukorossi) and arappu (Albizzia amara). Guru Nanak, the founding prophet and the first Guru of Sikhism, made references to soapberry tree and soap in 16th century. Washing of hair and body massage (champu) during a daily strip wash was an indulgence of early colonial traders in India. When they returned to Europe, they introduced their newly learnt habits, including the hair treatment they called shampoo.
- Yoga – Yoga as a physical, mental, and spiritual practice originated in ancient India.

=== Biology ===
- Hortus Malabaricus - Hortus Malabaricus is a 17th-century Latin botanical treatise documenting the varieties and medicinal properties of the flora of the Malabar coast.

=== Medicine ===
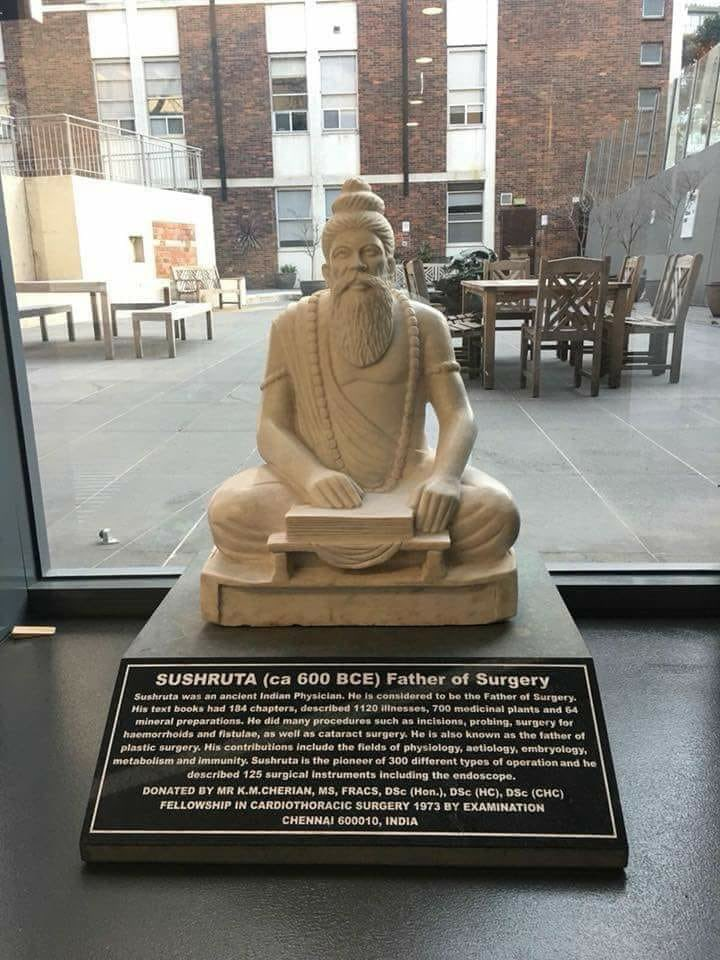
A statue of Sushruta (600 BCE), author of Sushruta Samhita and the founding father of surgery, at Royal Australasian College of Surgeons (RACS) in Melbourne, Australia

- Angina pectoris – The condition was named "hritshoola" in ancient India and was described by Sushruta (6th century BCE).
- Ayurvedic and Siddha medicine – Ayurveda and Siddha are ancient systems of medicine practised in South Asia. Ayurvedic ideas can be found in the Hindu text (mid-first millennium BCE). Ayurveda has evolved over thousands of years, and is still practised today. In an internationalised form, it can be thought of as a complementary and alternative medicine. In village settings, away from urban centres, it is simply "medicine." The Sanskrit word आयुर्वेदः (āyur-vedaḥ) means "knowledge (veda) for longevity (āyur)". Siddha medicine is mostly prevalent in South India, and is transmitted in Tamil, not Sanskrit, texts. Herbs and minerals are basic raw materials of the Siddha therapeutic system whose origins may be dated to the early centuries CE.
- Caesarian section – The Sanskrit medical treatise Sushruta Samhita, composed in the early 1st millennium CE, mentions post-mortem caesarean sections. The first available non-mythical record of a C-section is the mother of Bindusara (born c. 320 BC, ruled 298 – c. 272 BC), the 2nd Mauryan Samrat (emperor) of India, accidentally consumed poison and died when she was close to delivering him. Chanakya, Chandragupta's teacher and adviser, made up his mind that the baby should survive. He cut open the belly of the queen and took out the baby, thus saving the baby's life.
- Diabetes: Physicians Sushruta and Charaka distinguished the two different types of diabetes, which is latter dubbed as Type I and Type II diabetes.
- Ganja was used as herb for ayurverdic medicine development for last 2,000 years. The Sushruta Samhita, an ancient medical treatise, recommends cannabis plant extract for treating respiratory ailments and diarrhoea.
- Leprosy: Kearns & Nash (2008) state that the first mention of leprosy is described in the Indian medical treatise Sushruta Samhita (6th century BCE). However, The Oxford Illustrated Companion to Medicine holds that the mention of leprosy, as well as ritualistic cures for it, were described in the Atharva-veda (1500–1200 BCE), written before the Sushruta Samhita.
- Lithiasis treatment – The earliest operation for treating lithiasis, or the formations of stones in the body, is also given in the Sushruta Samhita (6th century BCE). The operation involved exposure and going up through the floor of the bladder.
- Otoplasty – Ear surgery was developed in ancient India and is described in the medical compendium, the Sushruta Samhita (Sushruta's Compendium, c. 500 AD).
- Tonsillectomy – Tonsillectomies have been practiced for over 2,000 years, with varying popularity over the centuries. The earliest mention of the procedure is in "Hindu medicine" from about 1000 BCE
- Turmeric used for wound healing. Analyses of pots discovered near New Delhi uncovered residue from turmeric, ginger and garlic that dates back as early as 2500 BCE. It was around 500 BCE that turmeric emerged as an important part of Ayurvedic medicine.

=== Equestrianism ===
- Toe stirrup – The earliest known manifestation of the stirrup, which was a toe loop that held the big toe was used in India in as early as 500 BCE or perhaps by 200 BCE according to other sources. This ancient stirrup consisted of a looped rope for the big toe which was at the bottom of a saddle made of fibre or leather. Such a configuration made it suitable for the warm climate of most of India where people used to ride horses barefoot. A pair of megalithic double bent iron bars with curvature at each end, excavated in Junapani in the central Indian state of Madhya Pradesh have been regarded as stirrups although they could as well be something else. Buddhist carvings in the temples of Sanchi, Mathura and the Bhaja caves dating back between the 1st and 2nd century BCE figure horsemen riding with elaborate saddles with feet slipped under girths. Sir John Marshall described the Sanchi relief as "the earliest example by some five centuries of the use of stirrups in any part of the world". In the 1st century CE horse riders in northern India, where winters are sometimes long and cold, were recorded to have their booted feet attached to hooked stirrups. However the form, the conception of the primitive Indian stirrup spread west and east, gradually evolving into the stirrup of today.

=== Metallurgy, gems and other commodities ===
- Crucible steel by the Wootz process – Perhaps as early as 300 BCE—although certainly by 200 BCE—high quality steel was being produced in southern India, by what Europeans would later call the crucible technique. Wootz steel is an ultra-high-carbon steel, with a natural inclusion of carbide forming Vanadium (~0.005%), resulting in the formation of nanomaterials in its microstructure and characterised by exhibiting properties such as superplasticity and high impact hardness. Archaeological and Tamil language literary evidence suggests that this manufacturing process was already in existence in South India well before the common era, with wootz steel exported from the Chera dynasty and called Seric Iron in Rome, and later known as Damascus steel in Europe. Reproduction research undertaken by Prof. J.D Verhoeven and Al Pendray identified the role of impurities within the local ore, in carbide formation, and repeated thermal cycling of blades, in the pattern creation, and reproduced Wootz steel blades with patterns microscopically and visually identical to ancient blade patterns.
- Diamond cutting and polishing – The technology of cutting and polishing diamonds was invented in India, Ratnapariksha, a text dated to 6th century talks about diamond cutting and Al-Beruni speaks about the method of using lead plate for diamond polishing in the 11th century CE.
- Diamond drills – in the 12th century BCE or 7th century BCE, Indians not only innovated use of diamond tipped drills but also invented double diamond tipped drills for bead manufacturing.
- Dockyard – The world's earliest enclosed dockyard was built in the Harappan port city of Lothal circa 2600 BC in Gujarat, India.
- Draw bar – The draw bar was applied to sugar-milling, with evidence of its use at Delhi in the Mughal Empire by 1540, but possibly dating back several centuries earlier to the Delhi Sultanate.
- Etched carnelian beads – are a type of ancient decorative beads made from carnelian with an etched design in white. They were made according to a technique of alkaline-etching developed by the Harappans during the 3rd millennium BCE and were widely disperced from China in the east to Greece in the west.
- Iron working – Iron works were developed in India, around the same time as, but independently of, Anatolia and the Caucasus. Archaeological sites in India, such as Malhar, Dadupur, Raja Nala Ka Tila and Lahuradewa in present-day Uttar Pradesh show iron implements in the period between 1800 BCE—1200 BCE. Early iron objects found in India can be dated to 1400 BCE by employing the method of radiocarbon dating. Spikes, knives, daggers, arrow-heads, bowls, spoons, saucepans, axes, chisels, tongs, door fittings etc. ranging from 600 BCE to 200 BCE have been discovered from several archaeological sites of India. Some scholars believe that by the early 13th century BCE, iron smelting was practised on a bigger scale in India, suggesting that the date the technology's inception may be placed earlier. In Southern India (present day Mysore) iron appeared as early as 11th to 12th centuries BCE; these developments were too early for any significant close contact with the northwest of the country. In the time of Chandragupta II Vikramaditya (375–413 CE), corrosion-resistant iron was used to erect the Iron pillar of Delhi, which has withstood corrosion for over 1,600 years.
- Lost-wax casting – Metal casting by the Indus Valley civilization began around 3500 BC in the Mohenjodaro area, which produced one of the earliest known examples of lost-wax casting, a bronze figurine named the "dancing girl"(c. 2300–1751 BCE). Other examples include the buffalo, bull and dog found at Mohenjodaro and Harappa, two copper figures found at the Harappan site Lothal in the district of Ahmedabad of Gujarat, and likely a covered cart with wheels missing and a complete cart with a driver found at Chanhudaro.
- Rain gauge – People living in India began to record rainfall in 400 BCE. The readings were correlated against expected growth. In the Arthashastra, used for example in Magadha, precise standards were set as to grain production. Each state storehouse was equipped with a rain gauge to classify land for taxation purposes.
- Seamless celestial globe – Considered one of the most remarkable feats in metallurgy, it was invented in India in between 1589 and 1590 CE. Before they were rediscovered in the 1980s, it was believed by modern metallurgists to be technically impossible to produce metal globes without any seams, even with modern technology.
- Stoneware – bangles have been excavated at Indus Valley Civilization sites of Harappa and Mohenjo Daro; kiln fired, at a temperature, above 1,150 °C (2,100 °F), several hundred decrees above the temperature necessary for earthenware, these are the earliest known stoneware ceramics.
- Touchstone – The touchstone was used during the Harappa period of the Indus Valley civilization ca. 2600–1900 BC for testing the purity of soft metals.
- Tube drawn technology: Indians used tube drawn technology for glass bead manufacturing which was first developed in the 2nd century BCE.
- Tumble polishing – Indians innvoted polishing method in the 10th century BCE for mass production of polished stone beads.

=== Metrology ===
- Standardisation – The oldest applications and evidence of standardisation come from the Indus Valley Civilisation in the 5th millennium BCE characterised by the existence of weights in various standards and categories as well as the Indus merchants usage of a centralised weight and measure system. Small weights were used to measure luxury goods, and larger weights were used for buying bulkier items, such as food grains etc. The weights and measures of the Indus civilisation also reached Persia and Central Asia, where they were further modified.

A total of 558 weights were excavated from Mohenjodaro, Harappa, and Chanhu-daro, not including defective weights. They did not find statistically significant differences between weights that were excavated from five different layers, each about 1.5 m in thickness. This was evidence that strong control existed for at least a 500-year period. The 13.7-g weight seems to be one of the units used in the Indus valley. The notation was based on the binary and decimal systems. 83% of the weights which were excavated from the above three cities were cubic, and 68% were made of chert.

- Technical standards – Technical standards were being applied and used in the Indus Valley civilisation since the 5th millennium BCE to enable gauging devices to be effectively used in angular measurement and measurement in construction. Uniform units of length were used in the planning and construction of towns such as Lothal, Surkotada, Kalibangan, Dholavira, Harappa, and Mohenjo-daro. The weights and measures of the Indus civilisation also reached Persia and Central Asia, where they were further modified.

=== Weapons ===
- Metal cylinder rocket: In the 16th century, Akbar was the first to initiate and use metal cylinder rockets known as bans, particularly against war elephants, during the Battle of Sanbal.
- Mysorean rockets – One of the first iron-cased rockets were deployed by Hyder Ali's army, ruler of the South Indian Kingdom of Mysore.
- Rocket artillery - The first true rocket artillery was developed by Tipu Sultan and was notably in use during the Anglo-Mysore Wars.

=== Philosophy and logic ===
- Catuskoti (Tetralemma) – The four-cornered system of logical argumentation with a suite of four distinct functions that refers to a logical proposition P, with four possibilities that can arise. The tetralemma has many logico-epistemological applications and has been made ample use of by the Indian philosopher Nāgarjuna in the Madhyamaka school. The tetralemma also features prominently in the Greek skepticist school of Pyrrhonism, the teachings of which are based on Buddhism. According to Christopher I. Beckwith, the founder of the Pyrrhonist school lived in India for 18 months and likely learned the language, which allowed him to carry these teachings to Greece. However, other scholars, such as Stephen Batchelor and Charles Goodman question Beckwith's conclusions about the degree of Buddhist influence on Pyrrho
- Trairūpya – Trairūpya is a logical argument that contains three constituents which a logical 'sign' or 'mark' (linga) must fulfill to be 'valid source of knowledge' (pramana):
1. It should be present in the case or object under consideration, the 'subject-locus' (pakṣa)
2. It should be present in a 'similar case' or a homologue (sapakṣa)
3. It should not be present in any 'dissimilar case' or heterologue (vipakṣa)

When a 'sign' or 'mark' (linga) is identified, there are three possibilities: the sign may be present in all, some, or none of the sapakṣas. Likewise, the sign may be present in all, some or none of the vipakṣas. To identify a sign, we have to assume that it is present in the pakṣa, however; that is the first condition is already satisfied. Combining these, Dignaga constructed his 'Wheel of Reason' (Sanskrit: Hetucakra).

- Jaina seven-valued logic – The Saptabhangivada, the seven predicate theory may be summarized as follows:

The seven predicate theory consists in the use of seven claims about sentences, each preceded by "arguably" or "conditionally" (syat), concerning a single object and its particular properties, composed of assertions and denials, either simultaneously or successively, and without contradiction. These seven claims are the following.

1. Arguably, it (that is, some object) exists (syad asty eva).
2. Arguably, it does not exist (syan nasty eva).
3. Arguably, it exists; arguably, it doesn't exist (syad asty eva syan nasty eva).
4. Arguably, it is non-assertible (syad avaktavyam eva).
5. Arguably, it exists; arguably, it is non-assertible (syad asty eva syad avaktavyam eva).
6. Arguably, it doesn't exist; arguably, it is non-assertible (syan nasty eva syad avaktavyam eva).
7. Arguably, it exists; arguably, it doesn't exist; arguably it is non-assertible (syad asty eva syan nasty eva syad avaktavyam eva).

=== Mathematics ===
Number System	Numbers									
Number System	0	1	2	3	4	5	6	7	8	9
Tamil	೦	௧	௨	௩	௪	௫	௬	௭	௮	௯
Gurmukhi	o	੧	੨	੩	੪	੫	੬	੭	੮	੯
Odia	୦	୧	୨	୩	୪	୫	୬	୭	୮	୯
Bengali	০	১	২	৩	৪	৫	৬	৭	৮	৯
Assamese	০	১	২	৩	৪	৫	৬	৭	৮	৯
Devanagari	०	१	२	३	४	५	६	७	८	९
Gujarati	૦	૧	૨	૩	૪	૫	૬	૭	૮	૯
Tibetan	༠	༡	༢	༣	༤	༥	༦	༧	༨	༩
Telugu	౦	౧	౨	౩	౪	౫	౬	౭	౮	౯
Kannada	೦	೧	೨	೩	೪	೫	೬	೭	೮	೯
Malayalam	൦	൧	൨	൩	൪	൫	൬	൭	൮	൯
Burmese	၀	၁	၂	၃	၄	၅	၆	၇	၈	၉
Khmer	០	១	២	៣	៤	៥	៦	៧	៨	៩
Thai	๐	๑	๒	๓	๔	๕	๖	๗	๘	๙
Lao	໐	໑	໒	໓	໔	໕	໖	໗	໘	໙
Balinese	᭐	᭑	᭒	᭓	᭔	᭕	᭖	᭗	᭘	᭙
Santali	᱐	᱑	᱒	᱓	᱔	᱕	᱖	᱗	᱘	᱙
Javanese	꧐	꧑	꧒	꧓	꧔	꧕	꧖	꧗	꧘	꧙

The half-chord version of the sine function was developed by the Indian mathematician Aryabhatta.

Brahmagupta's theorem (598–668) states that AF = FD.

- Zero – Zero and its operation are first defined by (Hindu astronomer and mathematician) Brahmagupta in 628. The Babylonians used a space, and later a zero glyph, in their written Sexagesimal system, to signify the 'absent', the Olmecs used a positional zero glyph in their Vigesimal system, the Greeks, from Ptolemy's Almagest, a ō, in a Sexagesimal system. The Chinese used a blank, in the written form of their decimal Counting rods system. A dot, rather than a blank, was first seen to denote zero, in a decimal system, in the Bakhshali manuscript. The usage of the zero in the Bakhshali manuscript has been dated between the 8th and 11th centuries, making it the earliest known usage of a written zero, in a decimal place value system.
- Hindu number system – With decimal place-value and a symbol for zero, this system was the ancestor of the widely used Arabic numeral system. It was developed in the Indian subcontinent between the 1st and 6th centuries CE.
- Law of signs in multiplication – The earliest use of notation for negative numbers, as subtrahend, is credited by scholars to the Chinese, dating back to the 2nd century BCE. Like the Chinese, the Indians used negative numbers as subtrahend, but were the first to establish the "law of signs" with regards to the multiplication of positive and negative numbers, which did not appear in Chinese texts until 1299. Indian mathematicians were aware of negative numbers by the 7th century, and their role in mathematical problems of debt was understood. Mostly consistent and correct rules for working with negative numbers were formulated, and the diffusion of these rules led the Arab intermediaries to pass it on to Europe., for example (+)×(-)=(-),(-)×(-)=(+) etc.
- Sign convention – Symbols, signs and mathematical notation were employed in an early form in India by the 6th century when the mathematician-astronomer Aryabhata recommended the use of letters to represent unknown quantities. By the 7th century Brahmagupta had already begun using abbreviations for unknowns, even for multiple unknowns occurring in one complex problem. Brahmagupta also managed to use abbreviations for square roots and cube roots. By the 7th century fractions were written in a manner similar to the modern times, except for the bar separating the numerator and the denominator. A dot symbol for negative numbers was also employed. The Bakhshali Manuscript displays a cross, much like the modern '+' sign, except that it symbolised subtraction when written just after the number affected. The '=' sign for equality did not exist. Indian mathematics was transmitted to the Islamic world where this notation was seldom accepted initially and the scribes continued to write mathematics in full and without symbols.
- Modern elementary arithmetic – Modum indorum or the method of the Indians for arithmetic operations was popularised by Al-Khwarizmi and Al-Kindi by means of their respective works such as in Al-Khwarizmi's on the Calculation with Hindu Numerals (ca. 825), On the Use of the Indian Numerals (ca. 830) as early as the 8th and 9th centuries.They, amongst other works, contributed to the diffusion of the Indian system of arithmetic in the Middle-East and the West.
- Chakravala method – The Chakravala method, a cyclic algorithm to solve indeterminate quadratic equations is commonly attributed to Bhāskara II, (c. 1114 – 1185 CE) although some attribute it to Jayadeva (c. 950~1000 CE). Jayadeva pointed out that Brahmagupta's approach to solving equations of this type would yield infinitely large number of solutions, to which he then described a general method of solving such equations. Jayadeva's method was later refined by Bhāskara II in his Bijaganita treatise to be known as the Chakravala method, chakra (derived from cakraṃ चक्रं) meaning 'wheel' in Sanskrit, relevant to the cyclic nature of the algorithm. With reference to the Chakravala method, E. O. Selenuis held that no European performances at the time of Bhāskara, nor much later, came up to its marvellous height of mathematical complexity.
- Trigonometric functions – The trigonometric functions sine and versine originated in Indian astronomy along with the cosine and inversine , adapted from the full-chord Greek versions (to the modern half-chord versions). They were described in detail by Aryabhata in the late 5th century, but were likely developed earlier in the Siddhantas, astronomical treatises of the 3rd or 4th century. Later, the 6th-century astronomer Varahamihira discovered a few basic trigonometric formulas and identities, such as sin^2(x) + cos^2(x) = 1.
- Mean value theorem – A special case of this theorem for inverse interpolation of the sine was first described by Parameshvara (1380–1460), from the Kerala School of Astronomy and Mathematics in India, in his commentaries on Govindasvāmi and Bhāskara II.
- Bhāskara I's sine approximation formula
- Madhava series – The infinite series for π and for the trigonometric sine, cosine, and arctangent is now attributed to Madhava of Sangamagrama (c. 1340 – 1425) and his Kerala school of astronomy and mathematics. He made use of the series expansion of $\arctan x$ to obtain an infinite series expression for π. Their rational approximation of the error for the finite sum of their series are of particular interest. They manipulated the error term to derive a faster converging series for π. They used the improved series to derive a rational expression,$104348/33215$ for π correct up to eleven decimal places, i.e. $3.1415926539214$. Madhava of Sangamagrama and his successors at the Kerala school of astronomy and mathematics used geometric methods to derive large sum approximations for sine, cosine, and arctangent. They found a number of special cases of series later derived by Brook Taylor series. They also found the second-order Taylor approximations for these functions, and the third-order Taylor approximation for sine. However, they did not formulate a systematic theory of differentiation and integration.
- Finite difference interpolation – The Indian mathematician Brahmagupta presented what is possibly the first instance of finite difference interpolation around 665 CE.
- Algebraic abbreviations – The mathematician Brahmagupta had begun using abbreviations for unknowns by the 7th century. He employed abbreviations for multiple unknowns occurring in one complex problem. Brahmagupta also used abbreviations for square roots and cube roots.
- Systematic generation of all permutations – The method goes back to Narayana Pandita in 14th-century India, and has been rediscovered frequently.
- Discovered by the Indian mathematician, Brahmagupta (598–668 CE):
  - Brahmagupta–Fibonacci identity
  - Brahmagupta formula
  - Brahmagupta theorem
- Combinatorics – the Bhagavati Sutra had the first mention of a combinatorics problem; the problem asked how many possible combinations of tastes were possible from selecting tastes in ones, twos, threes, etc. from a selection of six different tastes (sweet, pungent, astringent, sour, salt, and bitter). The Bhagavati is also the first text to mention the choose function. In the second century BC, Pingala included an enumeration problem in the Chanda Sutra (also Chandahsutra) which asked how many ways a six-syllable metre could be made from short and long notes. Pingala found the number of metres that had $n$ long notes and $k$ short notes; this is equivalent to finding the binomial coefficients.
- Jain texts define five different types of infinity – the infinite in one direction, the infinite in two directions, the infinite in area, the infinite everywhere, and the infinite perpetually. and the Satkhandagama
- Fibonacci numbers – This sequence was first described by Virahanka (c. 700 CE), Gopāla (c. 1135), and Hemachandra (c. 1150), as an outgrowth of the earlier writings on Sanskrit prosody by Pingala (c. 200 BCE).
- Madhava's correction terms – Madhava's correction term is a mathematical expression attributed to Madhava of Sangamagrama (c. 1340 – c. 1425), the founder of the Kerala school of astronomy and mathematics, that can be used to give a better approximation to the value of the mathematical constant π (pi) than the partial sum approximation obtained by truncating the Madhava-Leibniz infinite series for π. The Madhava-Leibniz infinite series for π.
- Pascal's triangle – Described in the 6th century CE by Varahamihira and in the 10th century by Halayudha, commenting on an obscure reference by Pingala (the author of an earlier work on prosody) to the "Meru-prastaara", or the "Staircase of Mount Meru", in relation to binomial coefficients. (It was also independently discovered in the 10th or 11th century in Persia and China.)
- Integral solution to Pell's equation – About a thousand years before Pell's time, Indian scholar Brahmagupta (598–668 CE) was able to find integral solutions to vargaprakṛiti (Pell's equation): $\ x^2-Ny^2=1,$ where N is a non-square integer, in his Brâhma-sphuṭa-siddhânta treatise.
- Ardhacheda – In the 8th century Jain mathematician Virasena is credited with a precursor to the binary logarithm. Virasena's concept of ardhacheda has been defined as the number of times a given number can be divided evenly by two. This definition gives rise to a function that coincides with the binary logarithm on the powers of two, but it is different for other integers, giving the 2-adic order rather than the logarithm.
- Kuṭṭaka – The Kuṭṭaka algorithm has much similarity with and can be considered as a precursor of the modern day extended Euclidean algorithm. The latter algorithm is a procedure for finding integers x and y satisfying the condition ax + by = gcd(a, b).

=== Linguistics and Literature ===
- Formal grammar / Formal systems – In his treatise Astadhyayi, Panini gives formal production rules and definitions to describe the formal grammar of Sanskrit. In formal language theory, a grammar (when the context is not given, often called a formal grammar for clarity) is a set of production rules for strings in a formal language. The rules describe how to form strings from the language's alphabet that are valid according to the language's syntax. A grammar does not describe the meaning of the strings or what can be done with them in whatever context—only their form. The Backus-Naur form, used to describe the syntax of programming languages, applies similar concepts.
- Sarvatobhadra Palindrome: The most complex palindrome, an example of which is in the Shishupala Vadha of Magha.

सकारनानारकास-
कायसाददसायका ।
रसाहवा वाहसार-
नादवाददवादना ॥

sakāranānārakāsa-
kāyasādadasāyakā
rasāhavā vāhasāra-
nādavādadavādanā.

sa	kā	ra	nā	nā	ra	kā	sa
kā	ya	sā	da	da	sā	ya	kā
ra	sā	ha	vā	vā	ha	sā	ra
nā	da	vā	da	da	vā	da	nā
(and the lines reversed)
nā	da	vā	da	da	vā	da	nā
ra	sā	ha	vā	vā	ha	sā	ra
kā	ya	sā	da	da	sā	ya	kā
sa	kā	ra	nā	nā	ra	kā	sa

"[That army], which relished battle (rasāhavā) contained allies who brought low the bodes and gaits of their various striving enemies (sakāranānārakāsakāyasādadasāyakā), and in it the cries of the best of mounts contended with musical instruments (vāhasāranādavādadavādanā)."

Palindromic Novel: The Ramakrishna Vilomakavyam by Dyvagnya Surya Pandita is an example of a narrative that, when read forward, relate the story of the Ramayana and, when read backward, relate the story of the Mahabharata.

=== Mining ===
- Diamond mining and diamond tools: Diamonds were first recognised and mined in central India, where significant alluvial deposits of the stone could then be found along the rivers Penner, Krishna and Godavari. It is unclear when diamonds were first mined in India, although estimated to be at least 5,000 years ago. India remained the world's only source of diamonds until the discovery of diamonds in Brazil in the 18th century. Golconda served as an important centre for diamonds in central India. Diamonds then were exported to other parts of the world, including Europe. Early references to diamonds in India come from Sanskrit texts. The Arthashastra of Kautilya mentions diamond trade in India. Buddhist works dating from the 4th century BCE mention it as a well-known and precious stone but don't mention the details of diamond cutting. Another Indian description written at the beginning of the 3rd century describes strength, regularity, brilliance, ability to scratch metals, and good refractive properties as the desirable qualities of a diamond. A Chinese work from the 3rd century BCE mentions: "Foreigners wear it [diamond] in the belief that it can ward off evil influences". The Chinese, who did not find diamonds in their country, initially used diamonds as a "jade cutting knife" instead of as a jewel.
- Zinc mining and medicinal zinc – Zinc was first smelted from zinc ore in India. Zinc mines of Zawar, near Udaipur, Rajasthan, were active during early Christian era. There are references of medicinal uses of zinc in the Charaka Samhita (300 BCE). The Rasaratna Samuccaya which dates back to the Tantric period (c. 5th – 13th century CE) explains the existence of two types of ores for zinc metal, one of which is ideal for metal extraction while the other is used for medicinal purpose. India was to melt the first derived from a long experience of the old alchemy zinc by the distillation process, an advanced technique. The ancient Persians had also tried to reduce zinc oxide in an open stove, but had failed. Zawar in Tiri valley of Rajasthan is the first known old zinc smelting site in the world. The distillation technique of zinc production dates back to the 12th century CE and is an important contribution of India in the world of science.

=== Astronomy ===
- Periodicity of comets – Indian astronomers by the 6th century CE believed that comets were apparitions that re-appeared periodically. This was the view expressed in the 6th century by the astronomers Varahamihira and Bhadrabahu, and the 10th-century astronomer Bhattotpala listed the names and estimated periods of certain comets, but it is unfortunately not known how these figures were calculated or how accurate they were.
- Geoheliocentricsm – A similar model was implicitly mentioned in the Hindu astronomical treatise Tantrasamgraha (c. 1500 CE) by Nilakantha Somayaji of the Kerala school of astronomy and mathematics.
- Reduction of the ecliptic: Achyutha Pisharadi discovered the techniques.

=== Miscellaneous ===
- Hookah or water pipe: according to Cyril Elgood (PP.41, 110), the physician Irfan Shaikh, at the court of the Mughal emperor Akbar I (1542–1605) invented the Hookah or water pipe used most commonly for smoking tobacco.
- Punch (drink) a mixed drink containing fruits or fruit juice that can be both alcoholic and non-alcoholic originated in the Indian subcontinent before making its way into England by passage through the East India Company. This beverage is very popular among the world with many varietal flavors and brands throughout the beverage industry.

== Modern India ==
=== Metallurgy, manufacturing, and heavy industry ===
- Carbon nitride solar reactor – In September 2021, A team from the Institute of Nano Science and Technology (INST), Mohali, has fabricated a prototype reactor which operates under natural sunlight to produce hydrogen at a scale of around 6.1 litres in eight hours. They have used an earth-abundant chemical called carbon nitrides as a catalyst for the purpose.
- Copper–chlorine cycle, BHAVINI commissions world’s first nuclear heat-based copper-chlorine cycle based hydrogen plant, Cu-Cl process uses high-temperature heat from a nuclear reactor to split water into hydrogen and oxygen, eliminating greenhouse gas emissions. Patent named "Hydrogen production method by multi-step copper-chlorine thermochemical cycle" was filed by ONGC Energy Centre Trust.
- Micro-substation, Tata power along with Nissin Electric demonstrated world's first microsubstation in Tata's Rohini plant, New Delhi that will provide cheap electricity to consumers.
- NML Magnetherm process is a large scale magnesium producing process, it is a kind of electrothermal process that produces at pilot scale of 300–450 kg raw material producing ~40 kg Magnesium/batch. A pilot plant is being constructed at Jamshedpur for using this process.
- Contactless Handwasher, is a device which provides automated touchless handwashing process, major advantage of this type of system is that it uses very less water and hand Washing for 2000 people requires only one soap refill.It was developed by CSIR-CMERI.
- Hydrogen DRI steel, Jindal Steel is making world's first hydrogen based DRI process in its steel plants in Angul.
- High ash coal gasification (coal to methanol) – The central government gave the country world's first 'coal to methanol' (CTM) plant built by the Bharat Heavy Electricals Limited (BHEL). The plant was inaugurated in BHEL's Hyderabad unit, The pilot project is the first that uses the gasification method for converting high-ash coal into methanol. Handling of high ash and heat required to melt this high amount of ash is a challenge in the case of Indian coal, which generally has high ash content. Bharat Heavy Electricals Limited has developed the fluidized bed gasification technology suitable for high ash Indian coals to produce syngas and then convert syngas to methanol with 99% purity.
- DMR 1700 steel – For several high-technology applications, such as military hardware and aerospace, need to possess ultrahigh strength (UHS; minimum yield strength of 1380 MPa (200 ksi)) coupled with high fracture toughness in order to meet the requirement of minimum weight while ensuring high reliability.
- DMR SN 742 is a nickel-based superalloy developed by the Defence Metallurgical Research Laboratory (DMRL) in India. It is specifically designed for aero-engine applications, such as high-pressure compressors (HPC) and turbine rotors (HPT) in gas turbine engines.
- GTM-900 is a high-temperature alpha-beta titanium alloy developed by National Aerospace Laboratories and DMRL used for components like compressor blades due to its strength and creep resistance at elevated temperatures.
- TITAN 26A and TITAN 29A, These are high-performance titanium-based alloys which are known for their high strength, creep resistance, and corrosion resistance, particularly in high-temperature environments.
- Magnesium-lithium alloy grade(Mg-9Li-7.5Al-1.2Sn), ISRO has successfully mastered melting and casting of this alloy using inert atmosphere. It is now possible to melt up to 20 kg of this alloy and gave stable properties up to 1000C.
- JD-1 alloy – A special lightweight alloy developed by Jindal Defence with a minimum guaranteed hardness of 500 HB. It can be used in aerospace, small arms, and engineering solutions. It is mainly used in armoured jacket.
- Polymetallic nodules, India is considered a pioneer in the exploration of polymetallic nodules, In 1981, Indian scientists recovered manganese nodules, marking the beginning of deep sea exploration in the country.In 1987, India became the first country to receive Pioneer Investor status from the International Seabed Authority (ISA).
- Sorption-enhanced steam methane reforming (SESMR) – In April 2022, the scientists from CSIR-Indian Institute of Chemical Technology (CSIR-IICT), Hyderabad developed a fluidized bed reactor (FBR) facility in Hyderabad to perform sorption enhanced steam methane reforming (SESMR) to achieve clean hydrogen in its purest form. The team of scientists have designed a hybrid material to simulate capturing carbon dioxide in-situ (onsite) and converting it into clean hydrogen from non-fuel grade bioethanol.
- Spray-drying buffalo milk – The collective consensus of dairy experts worldwide was that buffalo milk could not be spray-dried due to its high fat content. Harichand Megha Dalaya & his invention of the spray dry equipment, led to the world's first buffalo milk spray-dryer, at Amul Dairy in Gujarat.
- Neem-coated urea is an agriculture fertilizer in which the urea is neem oil-coated. The coating of neem slows the nitrification of urea thereby helps in increased absorption of nutrients in the soil as well as reduces groundwater pollution.
- Jackal steel – An advanced grade high-strength, low-alloy steel. The technology of Jackal steel has been passed on to Steel Authority of India Limited (SAIL) and MIDHANI for its bulk production.
- High-Rise Pantograph – The new-design world record pantograph, developed completely in-house for use in DFC & other freight routes with height of 7.5 metres (25 ft).
- Commercial CCU plant: Tuticorin Alkali Chemicals and Fertilizers Limited (TFL) partnered with Carbon Clean to create the world's first fully commercial CCU plant. The 10 MW facility captures coal-fired boiler flue gas and uses it to deliver industrial quality CO_{2}. The 10 MW facility captures coal-fired boiler flue gas and uses it to deliver industrial quality CO_{2}. The technology has been developed by Carbon Clean Solutions, headquartered in London – a start-up by two Indian engineers focusing on carbon dioxide separation technology.There are many chemicals exported out of India where CO_{2} is the raw material.
- Triple-stack container freight train – In order to ensure new streams of traffic and commodities and to bring about a modal shift, the DFC is undertaking trials for running smaller than usual containers, known as dwarf containers (where the container height is lower by 660 mm than normal containers), in triple-stack formation to further improve the profitability of train operations. It may be possible to run these as double-stack on conventional routes and triple-stack on routes with high-rise OHE, once the trials are successfully completed.

=== Medicine ===
- Cervical cerclage – was first described by V. N. Shirodkar in Bombay in 1955.
- Cholera toxin – Cholera toxin was discovered in 1959 by Indian microbiologist Sambhu Nath De.
- Balaglitazone(DRF-2593), In 1997 a small-molecule peroxisome proliferator-activated receptor γ (PPARγ) agonist discovered at Dr. Reddy's Laboratories (DRL) in Hyderabad, became one of the first fully homegrown drug at an Indian pharmaceutical company.
- In vitro fertilisation – the second successful birth of a 'test tube baby' occurred in India just 67 days after Louise Brown was born. The girl, named Durga, was conceived in vitro using a method developed independently by Subhash Mukhopadhyay, a physician and researcher from Kolkata. Mukhopadhyay had been performing experiments on his own with primitive instruments and a household refrigerator. However, state authorities prevented him from presenting his work at scientific conferences, and it was many years before Mukhopadhyay's contribution was acknowledged in works dealing with the subject.
- NexCAR19, is designed to target cancer cells carrying the CD19 protein, a marker on cancer cells, enhancing precision in treatment.
- Oral Rehydrated Solution (ORS), In 1952 Hemendra Nath Chatterjee was an Indian scientist from West Bengal known for the earliest publication of a formula for Orally Rehydrated Saline (ORS) for diarrhea. According to his paper, he treated 186 patients with his oral glucose with an oral glucose-sodium electrolyte solution and was able to rehydrate his patients with mild to moderately severe cholera.
- post-kala-azar dermal leishmaniasis – In 1922, Brahmachari also discovered a new, deadly form of leishmaniasis. He called it dermal leishmanoid, marked by the appearance of sudden eruptions on the face of the patients without fever or other complaints. He observed it as a disease in partially cured cases of kala-azar, along with those who had no history of the disease at all. It has since been termed as post-kala-azar dermal leishmaniasis.
- Visceral leishmaniasis, treatment of – The Indian (Bengali) medical practitioner Upendranath Brahmachari (19 December 1873 – 6 February 1946) was nominated for the Nobel Prize in Physiology or Medicine in 1929 for his discovery of 'ureastibamine (antimonial compound for treatment of kala azar) and a new disease, post-kalaazar dermal leishmanoid.' Brahmachari's cure for Visceral leishmaniasis was the urea salt of para-amino-phenyl stibnic acid which he called Urea Stibamine. Following the discovery of Urea Stibamine, Visceral leishmaniasis was largely eradicated from the world, except for some underdeveloped regions.
- Urea stibamine – Sir Upendranath Brahmachari synthesised urea-stibamine (carbostibamide) in 1922 and determined that it was an effective treatment for kala-azar (visceral leishmaniasis).
- LACC1 is a Peptidoglycan Editing Factor (PgeF) enzyme, acts as a molecular editor by detecting and removing these misincorporated amino acids. CSIR–CCMB team's discovery of PgeF enzyme opens doors for new antibiotics and insights into autoinflammatory diseases
- Zaynich, is a breakthrough Antimicrobial resistance (AMR) antibiotic designed to fight drug resistant superbugs of more than 30 varieties, its main ingredient is zidebactam, a newly discovered molecule developed by Wockhardt.

=== Electrical Engineering ===
- Ultra-High Voltage Transformer - In 2011, BHEL and Vijay Electricals have separately developed world's first Ultra High Voltage AC 1200kV Transformer through in-house R&D.
- Controlled shunt reactor – In 2002, Bharat Heavy Electricals Limited has successfully developed a first-of-its-kind in the world device for improving power transfer capability and reducing transmission losses in the country's highest rating (400 kV) transmission lines.The device is called Controlled Shunt Reactor.
- Virtual Magnet Synchronous Motor (VMSM): In 2026, Vimag Labs from Bengaluru invented this motor as it develops a virtual magnet as the software, power electronics and proprietary control algorithms is used to control the current and the shape of the magnetic field in real-time and uses a rotating transformer that transfers energy contactlessly into the rotor’s interior instead of brushes or slip rings, which cause wear.
- Electrically Excited Synchronous Motor (EESM) or Rare earth free motor: In 2021 deep-tech startup Chara Technologies has built scalable, cloud-controlled electric vehicle motors free of toxic rare-earth metals, thus cutting a massive dependency on imports to accelerate electric mobility in India.

=== Electronics and communications ===
- Carrier Ethernet Switch Router (CESR) are high capacity routers which provides carrier class Ethernet service which does Layer 2 and layer 3 functionality within one single layer and also it uses cut-through switching, developed by IIT Bombay in 2011 and technology was transferred to ECIL.
- Direct-to-Mobile (D2M) technology, developed by Saankya Labs and IIT Kanpur, This tech will enable mobile users to stream videos on their smartphones without an active internet connection.
- Entanglement-based QKD, DRDO and IIT Delhi demonstrated 1 km distance of quantum communication using quantumn entanglement based Quantum key distribution.
- Horn antenna or microwave horn, One of the first horn antennas was constructed by Jagadish Chandra Bose in 1897.
- Low Mobility Large cell (LMLC), is a feature of 5G and is designed to enhance the signal transmission range of a basestation several times, helping service providers cost-effectively expand coverage in rural areas.
- Phantom connectivity, a system for providing a higher level security to data communication in computer networks developed by ISRO. Phantom connectivity model enables organization to copy users download data from Internet to Intranet without connecting both the networks.
- Radiowave communication – In November 1894, the Indian physicist, Jagadish Chandra Bose, demonstrated publicly the use of radio waves in Calcutta.
- Waveguide – Jagadish Chandra Bose researched millimetre wavelengths using waveguides, and in 1897 described to the Royal Institution in London his research carried out in Kolkata.

=== Computers and programming languages ===
- geotargeted TV advertising - Amagi Media Labs technology has replaced physical TV hardware with Cloud-Native and AI driven software for region-specific or localized ads and content over a single national feed without needing separate satellite transponders. Amagi owns 10 patents related to the invention.
- Autolay, is an interactive GUI CAD software for the design of aircraft composite components developed by Aeronautical Development Agency, this tool was developed in late 1980's and used by all big aerospace companies such as Boeing, Airbus and Dassault Systèmes
- chatbot-based conversational AI, one of early modern AI/ML based chatbot was released by Haptik.ai in 2013, when chatbots were not common.
- File Transfer Protocol (FTP) – A standard communication protocol used for the transfer of computer files from a server to a client on a computer network. FTP is built on a client–server model architecture using separate control and data connections between the client and the server. Abhay Bhushan drafted the initial File Transfer Protocol (RFC 114), in April 1971, while a student at the MIT.
- Fragalyst, is a software for analysis of fragments from an explosion or blast developed by CSIR-CIMFR, the technology allows us to visualize the blast & fragments in a computer GUI.
- Julia is a high-level, dynamic programming language. Its features are well suited for numerical analysis and computational science. Viral B. Shah an Indian computer scientist contributed to the development of the language in Bangalore while also actively involved in the initial design of the Aadhaar project in India using India Stack.
- Kojo – A programming language and integrated development environment (IDE) for computer programming and learning. Kojo is an open-source software. It was created, and is actively developed, by Lalit Pant, a computer programmer and teacher living in Dehradun, India.
- Star Plat, a Domain-Specific Programming Language(DSL) for writing graph algorithms, allowing programmers to write code using simple, high-level language constructs without needing advanced parallel programming skills.
- RISC-V ISA (microprocessor) implementations (a US standard, not from India, but some implementations are such as those below):
  - SHAKTI – Open Source, Bluespec System Verilog definitions, for FinFET implementations of the ISA, have been created at IIT Madras, and are hosted on GitLab.
  - VEGA Microprocessors – India's first indigenous 64-bit, superscalar, out-of-order, multi-core RISC-V Processor design, developed by C-DAC.
- TCS BaNCS, was one of the first core banking software started implemented in late 1970s and released in early 80s.
- Visual J# – A transitional programming language for programmers of Java and Visual J++ languages, so they could use their existing knowledge and applications on .NET Framework. It was developed by the Hyderabad-based Microsoft India Development Center at HITEC City in India.

=== Construction, civil engineering and architecture ===
- Coal Mine to PSP, Coal India will turn abandoned mines or de-coaled mine to Pumped Storage Projects(PSP) with help of NHPC hence saving huge amount of capital for development of reservoir or dams.
- CO_{2}-treated-C&D, researchers at the Centre for Sustainable Technologies (CST) at IISc are exploring ways to store carbon dioxide from industrial flue gas in excavated soil from Construction and Demolition (C&D) waste. They are investigating the effects of injecting carbon dioxide gas into clayey soil, which is typically excavated from construction sites. This process has resulted in better stabilization of clay through the use of cement and lime, as well as a reduction in the surface area, pore volume, and lime reactivity of the clay in the soil, thereby improving the bulk engineering performance of the material.
- (I)-TM Tunneling technique:(I)-TM as Himalayan tunnelling method for tunnelling through the Himalayan geology to build tunnels in Jammu and Kashmir. Engineers decided to provide rigid supports using 'ISHB' as against the lattice girder method used in the New Austrian Tunnelling Method.ISHB uses nine-metre pipes in the mountains. It is called pipe roofing. Engineers made an umbrella using these perforated poles and filled them with PU grout.
- Plastic road are made entirely of plastic or of composites of plastic with other materials. Plastic roads are different from standard roads in the respect that standard roads are made from asphalt concrete, which consists of mineral aggregates and asphalt. Most plastic roads sequester plastic waste within the asphalt as an aggregate. Plastic roads first developed by Rajagopalan Vasudevan in 2001
- Rib & spine/Spine & Wing technique, NHAI has developed a flyover design which allows to save cost, time, minimum material usage and allows light under the flyover using the same technique.
- Steel slag road, world's first steel slag road NH-66 was constructed by Central Road Research Institute under CSIR.
- waterproof roads, zydex industries has developed waterproof road by forming a skin like layer that is water resistant using inhouse silane nanotechnology.

=== Food ===
- Butter chicken was invented in Moti Mahal restaurant in Daryaganj of Delhi in 1950's.
- Butter garlic prawns are prawns fried in garlic and dipped in butter curry. Originally from Mumbai, they're usually eaten with bread or pasta.
- Chicken 65 is a spicy, deep-fried chicken from Chennai, first invented by Hotel Buhari.
- Chicken lollipop is a fried chicken appetizer, believed to have originated in eastern India.
- Indian filter coffee, a drip coffee made from dark roasted coffee beans (70%–80%) and chicory (20%–30%), in a two part, pressed and perforated stainless steel utensil, was developed and promoted, by the Coffee Board of India, from the 1940s, to encourage domestic consumption.
- Honey Chilli Potato is an Indian starter that originated in Indo-Chinese restaurants of Kolkata.
- Instant momos, popularly known as Frozen Momos, were introduced in 2021 by the food brand Prasuma and are similar to noodles in their preparation through oil and hot water.

=== Finance and banking ===
- Payments bank is an Indian new model of banks conceptualised by the Reserve Bank of India (RBI) without issuing credit.

=== Paleontology ===
- In 2024, one of the longest snakes to ever exist, Vasuki indicus, was discovered by scientists from the Indian Institute of Technology led by Sunil Bajpai. The snake was estimated to be between 10.9 and 15.2 metres in length and lived 47 million years ago. The fossilised vertebrae of Vasuki indicus were discovered in a lignite mine in Gujarat. It was likely a slow moving predator who killed its prey through constriction.
- In 2018, scientists from the Geological Survey of India and the Indian Institute of Technology led by Sunil Bajpai discovered the fossil remains of a previously unknown dinosaur species in the Thar Desert region of Jaisalmer, Rajasthan. The dinosaur is named Tharosaurus indicus, after the Thar Desert and India.

=== Zoology ===
- The world's first white tiger was Mohan, a mutant Bengal tiger captured in 1951 by Maharaja Martand Singh of Rewa. These types of tiger are found in White Tiger Safari & Zoo Mukundpur

=== Genetics ===
- Mallika (mango) - The 'Mallika' mango is the result of the hybridization of the Indian mango varieties Neelum and Dasheri, The variety was developed by Indian Agricultural Research Institute (IARI) in New Delhi.
- Amrapali mango – A named mango cultivar introduced in 1971 by Dr. Pijush Kanti Majumdar at the Indian Agriculture Research Institute in Delhi.
- Asmon, is a plant based drug that is used to treat bronchial asthma developed by CSIR.
- Mynvax – The world's first "warm" COVID-19 vaccine, developed by IISc, capable of withstanding 37 °C (99 °F) for a month and neutralise all coronavirus variants of concern.
- ZyCoV-D vaccine – The world's first DNA-based vaccine for humans.

=== Metrology ===
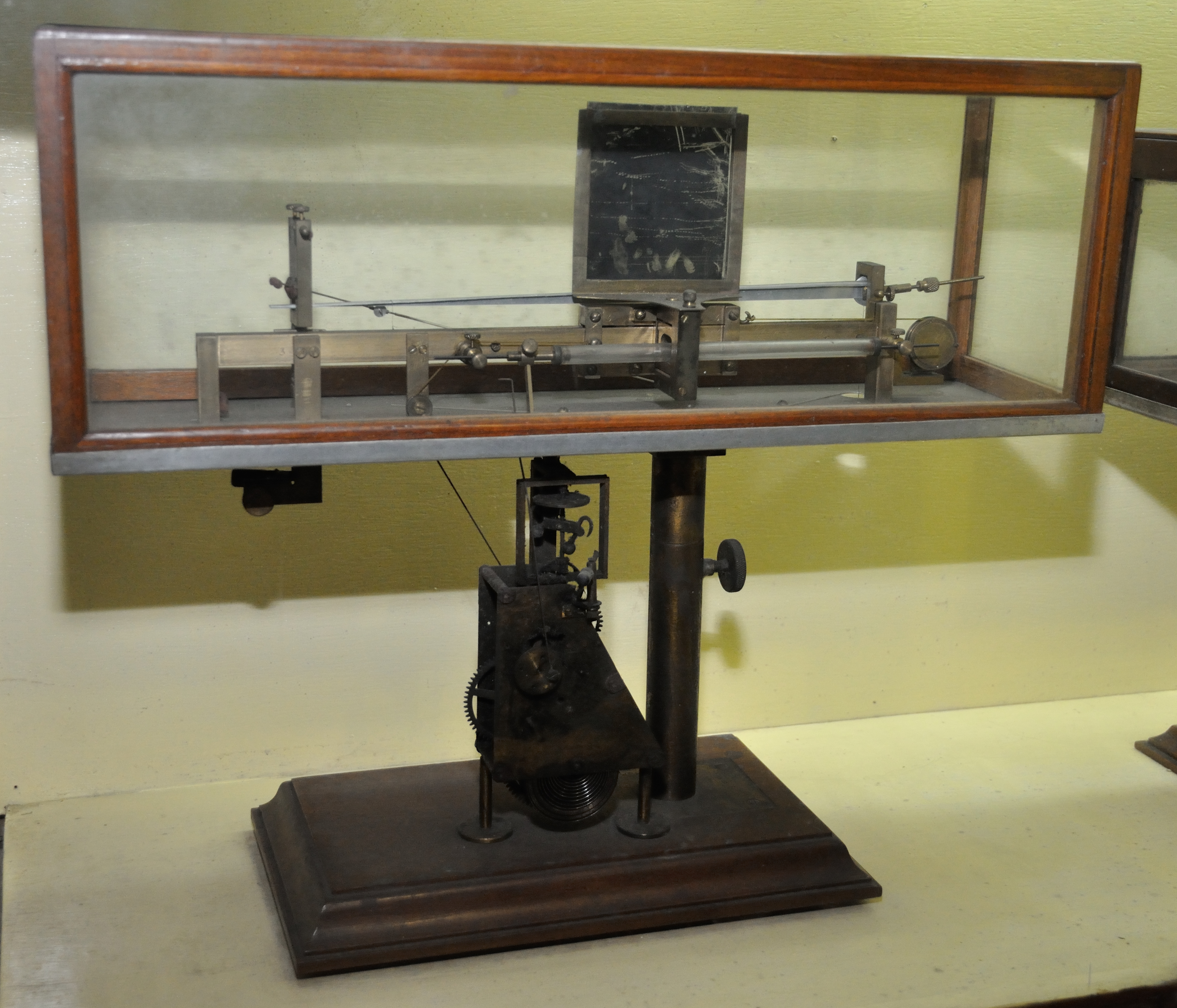
Crescograph, Bose Institute, Kolkata

- Crescograph – The crescograph, a device for measuring growth in plants, was invented in the early 20th century by the Bengali scientist Sir Jagadish Chandra Bose.
- Shearing interferometer – Invented by M.V.R.K. Murty, a type of Lateral Shearing Interferometer utilises a laser source for measuring refractive index.

=== Rocket science and jet propulsion ===
- Single-piece 3D-printed rocket engine - IIT Madras’ startup, Agnikul Cosmos, has launched the world’s first rocket with a single-piece three-dimensional (3D) printed engine. The rocket Agnibaan SOrTeD (SubOrbital Technological Demonstrator) is also India’s first semi-cryogenic engine-powered rocket launch that was completely designed and manufactured indigenously.
- Advanced Technology Vehicle - Scramjet, the ISRO has twice successfully test fired a modified Rohini 560 rocket, with added, 2nd stage, air-breathing, Scramjet engines.
- Small Satellite Launch Vehicle, is a multi-stage solid propellent rocket that is cost-effective and very less complex used to deliver micro-satellites less than 500 kg weight. it is innovative as its three stages are solid propellent making it very efficient.
- Solid Fuel Ducted Ramjet, is a jet propulsion technology which uses solid propellant, developed by Defence Research and Development Organisation.

=== Weapon systems ===
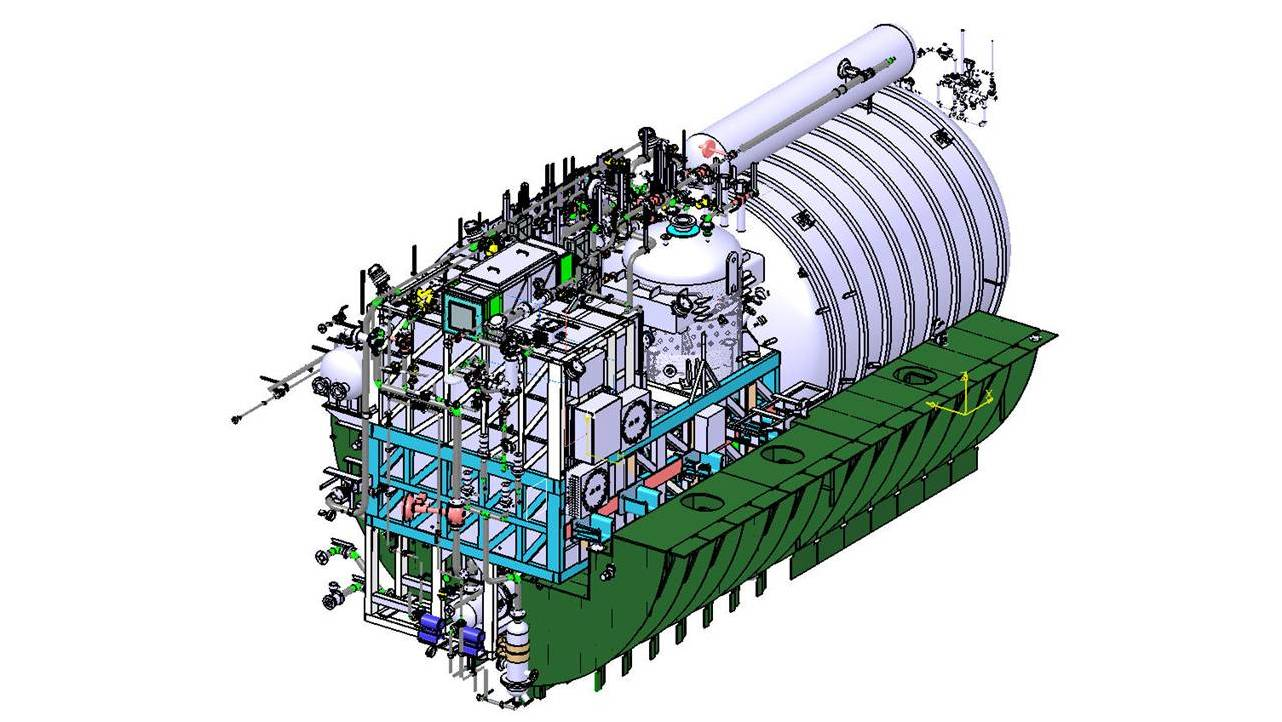
A diagram of the fuel-cell AIP module developed by the DRDO of India, it can power ships or any other marine transport

- ATAGS – Bharat Forge and the DRDO has developed world's first electric artillery gun
- Bhargavastra, is the world's first kind of multi-micro-missile system to counter swarm drones, low-cost portable system developed by Solar Defence and Aerospace.
- Critical Situation Response Vehicle (CSRV) – The Central Reserve Police Force (CRPF) has made and inducted a bomb/bulletproof armoured vehicle. The latest all-terrain highly sophisticated vehicle 'CSRV' has given a shot in the arm to the Central Reserve Police Force engaged in counter-terror operations.
- E-bomb – The Defence Research and Development Organisation (DRDO) has been developing an e-bomb which will emit electromagnetic shock waves that destroy electronic circuits and communication networks of enemy force. The tow bodies in Lakshya-2 Weapon Delivery Configuration carry High Energy Weapon Payload.
- Phosphoric Acid Fuel Cell air-independent propulsion (PAFC AIP) is a 270 kilowatt phosphoric acid fuel cell (PAFC) air-independent propulsion (AIP) system to power the Kalvari-class submarines is developed by the Naval Materials Research Laboratory of Indian Defence Research and Development Organisation in collaboration with Larsen & Toubro and Thermax. The patent is owned by DRDO. Its application is considered to be wide and it can also power ships in future.
- Photonic radar, On 29 June 2025, DRDO announced that it has completed building the photonic radar for fighter jets, which will replace AESA Radar, such type of radars cannot be easily jammed. The radar is made out of multiple Photonic Transmit Receive modules. In 2022, they tested the radar which was able to image small objects, measuring just 3 x 4 cm (1.2 x 1.6 in).
- Ramjet artillery shells, IIT Madras with support of Army Technology Board(ATB) has developed world's first ramjet-powered shells for 155m artillery guns.
- Rifle-rated ballistic helmet, MKU has developed what it bills as "a first-of-its-kind rifle-rated ballistic helmet", MKU states that the Kavro Doma 360 is "the first anti-rifle helmet in the world that does not have bolts or any metal parts"

=== Automotive innovations ===
- CNG car/vehicle – Bajaj Auto launched the first 'commercial' lot of its CNG (Compressed Natural Gas) autorickshaws in Delhi on 29 May 2000. By 1 December 2002, the last diesel bus had disappeared from Delhi's roads, all buses were running on CNG. At the beginning of 2005, 10,300 CNG busses, 10,000 CNG taxis and 10,000 CNG cars run on Delhi's roads.
- Exhaust Torque Expansion Chamber branded as ExhausTEC, the technology involves use of a small chamber connected to the exhaust pipe of the engine to modify the back-pressure and the swirl characteristics, with an aim to improve the low-end performance of the bikes. The technology is patented by Bajaj.
- Crawl Technology, Bajaj Auto developed this technology in 2026 to help the motorcycle ride slowly in heavy traffic at the speed of 0-30kmph, while not pressing the throttle frequently and while using only clutch.
- SL-ISG, Sedemac has developed world’s first Sensorless Integrated Starter Generator (ISG) technology, Sedemac’s ISG uses a sensorless motor control architecture, eliminating the need for rotor position sensors.
- DTS-Si, stands for 'Digital Twin Spark-Swirl induction' system. Some of Bajaj's bike engines have the patented 'DTS Si' (Digital Twin Spark-Swirl induction) technology. Bajaj Auto claims that new engine with swirl induction gives better mileage under ideal (standard) test conditions that are higher than some of the 100cc motorcycles offer.
- Helmet AC - Featuring a plastic top and built-in-fan-like structure, the AC helmets are powered by a battery pack, which is worn by the traffic police officials on their waist. These helmets work for around 8 hours on a single full charge.
- Suri Transmission, is a hydromechanical transmission unit for diesel locomotives developed by Man Mohan Suri.

=== Mathematics ===
- AKS primality test and Agrawal's conjecture– The AKS primality test is a deterministic primality-proving algorithm created and published by three Indian Institute of Technology Kanpur computer scientists, Manindra Agrawal, Neeraj Kayal, and Nitin Saxena on 6 August 2002 in a paper titled PRIMES is in P. Commenting on the impact of this discovery, Paul Leyland noted: "One reason for the excitement within the mathematical community is not only does this algorithm settle a long-standing problem, it also does so in a brilliantly simple manner. Everyone is now wondering what else has been similarly overlooked".
- Basu's theorem – The Basu's theorem, a result of Debabrata Basu (1955) states that any complete sufficient statistic is independent of any ancillary statistic.
- Kaprekar Constants: Numbers 495 and 6174. The Indian mathematician D.R.Kaprekar discovered the number 6174 is reached after repeatedly subtracting the smallest number from the largest number that can be formed from any four digits not all the same. The number 495 is similarly reached for three digits number.
- Kosambi–Karhunen–Loève theorem (also known as the Karhunen–Loève theorem) The Kosambi-Karhunen-Loève theorem is a representation of a stochastic process as an infinite linear combination of orthogonal functions, analogous to a Fourier series representation of a function on a bounded interval. Stochastic processes given by infinite series of this form were first considered by Damodar Dharmananda Kosambi.
- Kosaraju's algorithm is a linear time algorithm to find the strongly connected components of a directed graph. Aho, Hopcroft and Ullman credit it to S. Rao Kosaraju and Micha Sharir. Kosaraju suggested it in 1978.
- Multivariate Statistical Theory, is one of the base foundational concept of statistics was developed by C. R. Rao in 1952 when he was in Indian Statistical Institute, Kolkata.
- Parthasarathy–Ranga Rao–Varadarajan determinants or PRV determinants, K. R. Parthasarathy along with R. Ranga Rao and Veeravalli S. Varadarajan discovered these class of determinants in Representations of Complex Semi-Simple Lie Groups and Lie Algebras, the paper has subsequently often been referred to as the "PRV paper".
- Parthasarathy's theorem. is a generalization of Von Neumann's minimax theorem created by Thiruvenkatachari Parthasarathy.
- Partial Balanced Incomplete Block Designs (BIBD) was developed by Raj Chandra Bose and Kesavan Raghavan Nair in 1939.
- Ramanujan theta function, Ramanujan prime, Ramanujan summation, Ramanujan graph and Ramanujan's sum – Discovered by the Indian mathematician Srinivasa Ramanujan in the early 20th century.
- Rao's Score Test was first published in 1948 in Sankhya: The Indian Journal of Statistics titled On Distributions of the Maximum Likelihood Estimates by C. R. Rao.
- Roy's Largest Root Test, proposed the test in 1953 as part of his "union-intersection principle", a unified approach to multivariate hypothesis testing.
- Roy-Hotelling Theorem, is used to connects the eigenvalues of matrices in multivariate statistics proposed in 1953.
- Seshadri constant – In algebraic geometry, a Seshadri constant is an invariant of an ample line bundle L at a point P on an algebraic variety.The name is in honour of the Indian mathematician C. S. Seshadri.
- Sieve of Sundaram, is a prime number generation algorithm that was developed by Indian math student S. P. Sundaram.
- Shrikhande graph – Graph invented by the Indian mathematician S.S. Shrikhande in 1959.
- Standard monomial theory, C. S. Seshadri introduced a concept named Standard Monomials in 1978.

=== Applied science and technology ===
- Bipyrazole Organic Crystals, the piezoelectric molecules developed by IISER scientists recombine following mechanical fracture without any external intervention, autonomously self-healing in milliseconds with crystallographic precision.
- SEBEX 2, is a high performance explosive, it is said to be 2.01 times more lethal than TNT and most powerful non-nuclear explosives in the world. The Indian Navy has certified the explosive.
- Magnetic superatoms. In 2009 a team of Harish Chandra Research Institute, Allahabad discovered magnetic superatoms.
- Silica fiber based composite or Silica-Silica composite, In 2012 ISRO developed world's first pure silica fiber composite without carbon element known as silica fiber-silica matrix composite and also a new technology for developing silica fibres by sol-gel process. These fibres can be used for high temperature insulation up to 1500C and cheaper than Carbon fiber composite. Silica-silica composite are prepared by leaching glass cloth with hydrochloric acid, rinsing to remove acid therefrom, vacuum drying, moulding and treating with ethyl silicate and cationic starch binder further drying and sintering. The patent was filed by VSSC in 2005 and was granted in 2012.
- Single-crystalline scandium nitride, that has the ability to convert infrared light into energy, Scientists based in Jawaharlal Nehru Centre for Advanced Scientific Research (JNCASR), Bengaluru have discovered a novel material that can emit, detect, and modulate infrared light with high efficiency making it useful for solar and thermal energy harvesting and for optical communication devices.
- Low-threshold gain lasers, researchers from IISER, Bhopal have made a breakthrough in field of low threshold gain lasers using crystals of cesium lead bromide they are able to produce high-intensity lasers with very low energy output.
- Indian Ocean Dipole is an unusual pattern in the ocean-atmosphere system of the equatorial Indian Ocean that influences the monsoon and can offset the adverse impact of El Nino. It is typically characterized by cooler than normal eastern equatorial Indian Ocean and warmer than normal west and unusual equatorial easterly winds. It was discovered in Centre for Atmospheric And Oceanic Sciences, IISc. team led by NH Saji in 1999.
- Zinc gel battery. Offgrid Energy Labs, a Gurugram-based deep-tech company focused on energy storage has developed and patented the world's first zinc gel battery.
- Iron ion battery. In 2019 world's 1st iron-ion battery was first invented by team of researchers in IIT Madras.
- Solution combustion synthesis (SCS) was accidentally discovered in 1988 at Indian Institute of Science (IISc), Bengaluru, India. SCS involves an exothermic redox chemical reaction between an oxidizer like metal nitrate and a fuel in an aqueous medium.
- Nalgonda Technique is a technique for defluoridation to reduce the fluoride levels in water developed by National Environmental Engineering Research Institute, Nagpur.
- MD-15 is a new methanol fuel grade in which Methanol is blended with diesel. Research Design and Standards Organisation (RDSO), in collaboration with the Indian Oil Corporation Ltd (IOCL), has developed a special cost-effective fuel that would not only minimize IR's dependency on diesel, but will also be emit fewer pollutants. IOCL developed the composition, adding 14% additives (developed indigenously by IOCL) along with 71% mineral diesel, 15% methanol. MD-15 fuelled engine has shown superior performance, emission and combustion characteristics than the mineral diesel fuelled engine.
- Photon Multiplicity Detector, is a detector for study of Quark-gluon plasma and photons developed by Institute of Physics and Variable Energy Cyclotron Centre, PMD is used in Large Hadron Collider to measure the multiplicity of photons.
- Phytorid Wastewater Treatment Technology, is a solution for sustainable wastewater treatment, developed by NEERI (CSIR), It is particularly useful for regions lacking advanced sewage infrastructure.
- Unified Payments Interface – An instant real-time bank to bank payments protocol system developed by National Payments Corporation of India (NPCI) facilitated by QR code and Virtual Private Address(VPA) or UPI ID. UPI has able to make India a cashless and cardless economy, also strain on ATM infrastructure has reduced significantly.
- Digital rupee (e₹) or eINR or e-rupee is a world's first digital national currency, to be issued by the Reserve Bank of India (RBI) as a central bank digital currency (CBDC). Digital Rupee is using blockchain distributed-ledger technology. Digital rupee users to hit 50,000 by Jan-end on better acceptance.

=== Sciences ===
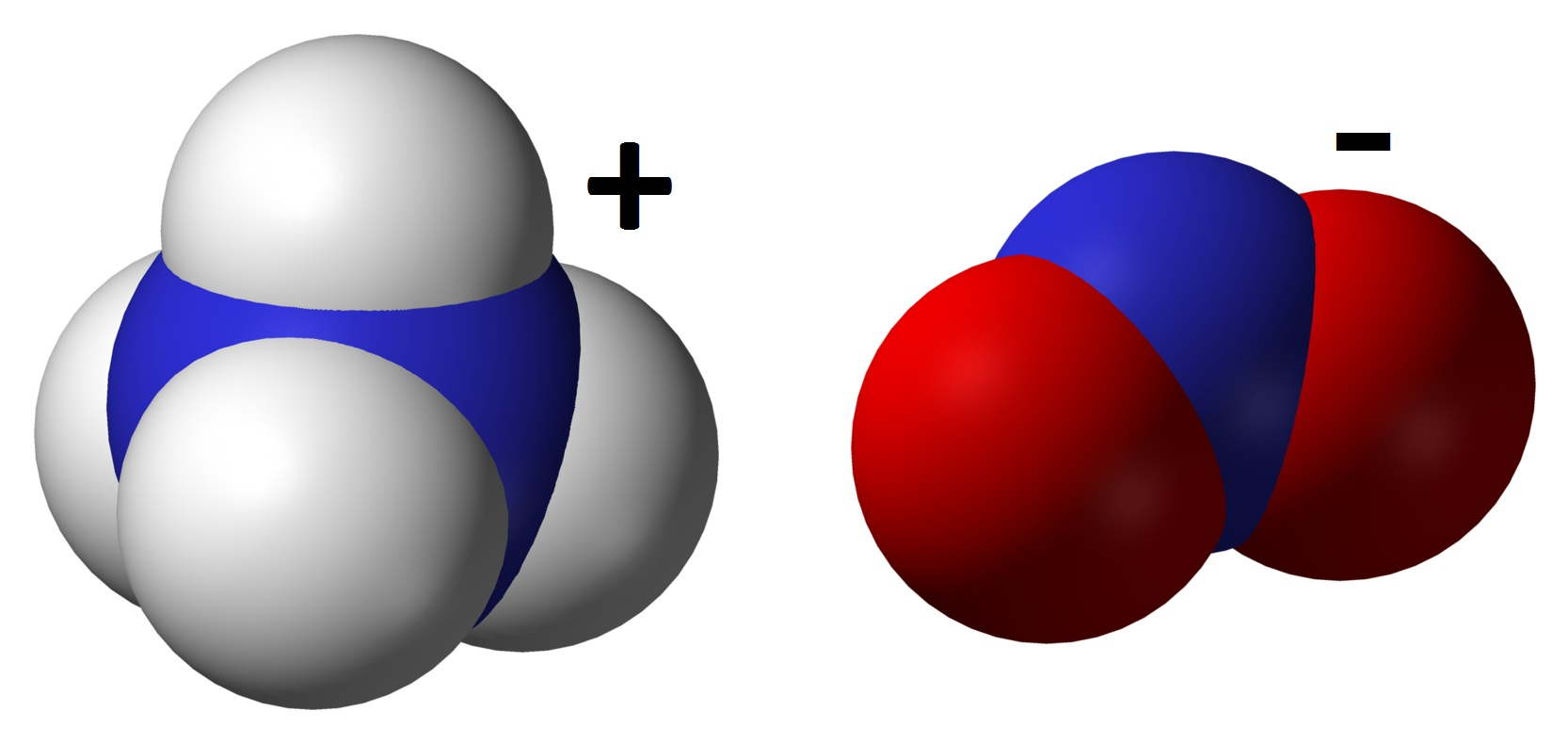
Bengali Chemist Prafulla Chandra Roy synthesised NH_{4}NO_{2} in its pure form.

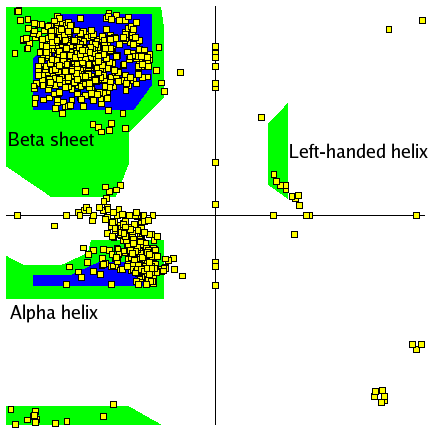
A Ramachandran plot generated from the protein PCNA, a human DNA clamp protein that is composed of both beta sheets and alpha helices (PDB ID 1AXC). Points that lie on the axes indicate N- and C-terminal residues for each subunit. The green regions show possible angle formations that include Glycine, while the blue areas are for formations that don't include Glycine.

- Ammonium nitrite, synthesis in pure form – Prafulla Chandra Roy synthesised NH_{4}NO_{2} in its pure form, and became the first scientist to have done so. Prior to Ray's synthesis of Ammonium nitrite it was thought that the compound undergoes rapid thermal decomposition releasing nitrogen and water in the process.
- Bhabha scattering – In 1935, Indian nuclear physicist Homi J. Bhabha published a paper in the Proceedings of the Royal Society, Series A, in which he performed the first calculation to determine the cross section of electron-positron scattering. Electron-positron scattering was later named Bhabha scattering, in honour of his contributions in the field.
- Bhatnagar-Mathur Magnetic Interference Balance: Invented jointly by Shanti Swarup Bhatnagar and K.N. Mathur in 1928, the so-called 'Bhatnagar-Mathur Magnetic Interference Balance' was a modern instrument used for measuring various magnetic properties. The first appearance of this instrument in Europe was at a Royal Society exhibition in London, where it was later marketed by British firm Messers Adam Hilger and Co, London.
- Bose–Einstein statistics, condensate – On 4 June 1924 the Indian physicist Satyendra Nath Bose mailed a short manuscript to Albert Einstein entitled Planck's Law and the Light Quantum Hypothesis seeking Einstein's influence to get it published after it was rejected by the prestigious journal Philosophical Magazine. The paper introduced what is today called Bose statistics, which showed how it could be used to derive the Planck blackbody spectrum from the assumption that light was made of photons. Einstein, recognizing the importance of the paper translated it into German himself and submitted it on Bose's behalf to the prestigious Zeitschrift für Physik. Einstein later applied Bose's principles on particles with mass and quickly predicted the Bose-Einstein condensate.
- Boson: Satyendra Nath Bose's research led to the discovery of the Boson, one of the elementary particles on the Standard Model of Particle Physics.
- Braunstein-Ghosh-Severini Entropy – This modelling of entropy using network theory is used in the analysis of quantum gravity and is named after Sibasish Ghosh and his teammates, Samuel L. Braunstein and Simone Severini.
- Dual-phase steel, was publicly first described in "Microstructure and tensile properties of high strength duplex ferrite–martensite (DFM) steels" by P.C. Chakraborti and M.K. Mitra.
- Galena, applied use in electronics of – Bengali scientist Sir Jagadish Chandra Bose effectively used Galena crystals for constructing radio receivers. The Galena receivers of Bose were used to receive signals consisting of shortwave, white light and ultraviolet light. In 1904 Bose patented the use of Galena Detector which he called Point Contact Diode using Galena.
- Mahalanobis distance – Introduced in 1936 by the Indian (Bengali) statistician Prasanta Chandra Mahalanobis (29 June 1893 – 28 June 1972), this distance measure, based upon the correlation between variables, is used to identify and analyze differing pattern with respect to one base.
- Mercurous nitrite – The compound mercurous nitrite was discovered in 1896 by the Bengali chemist Prafulla Chandra Roy, who published his findings in the Journal of the Asiatic Society of Bengal. The discovery contributed as a base for significant future research in the field of chemistry.
- Ramachandran plot, Ramachandran map, and Ramachandran angles: The Ramachandran plot and Ramachandran map were developed by Gopalasamudram Narayana Iyer Ramachandran, who published his results in the Journal of Molecular Biology in 1963. He also developed the Ramachandran angles, which serve as a convenient tool for communication, representation, and various kinds of data analysis.
- Raman effect – The Encyclopædia Britannica (2008) reports: "change in the wavelength of light that occurs when a light beam is deflected by molecules. The phenomenon is named for Sir Chandrasekhara Venkata Raman, who discovered it in 1928. When a beam of light traverses a dust-free, transparent sample of a chemical compound, a small fraction of the light emerges in directions other than that of the incident (incoming) beam. Most of this scattered light is of unchanged wavelength. A small part, however, has wavelengths different from that of the incident light; its presence is a result of the Raman effect."
- Raychaudhuri equation – Discovered by the Bengali physicist Amal Kumar Raychaudhuri in 1954. This was a key ingredient of the Penrose-Hawking singularity theorems of general relativity.
- S-duality, strong-weak coupling duality is a concept of string theory developed by Ashoke Sen.
- Saha ionization equation is an expression that relates the ionization state of a gas in thermal equilibrium to the temperature and pressure.
- Periodicity in Nuclear Properties: A sharp pattern is discovered by an Indian researcher regarding the nuclear properties of chemical elements. The remarkable deviations are noticed near the magic numbers.
- Process of formation of the E layer of the ionosphere and night sky luminescence: Discovered by the Indian physicist, Sisir Kumar Mitra.

=== Space ===
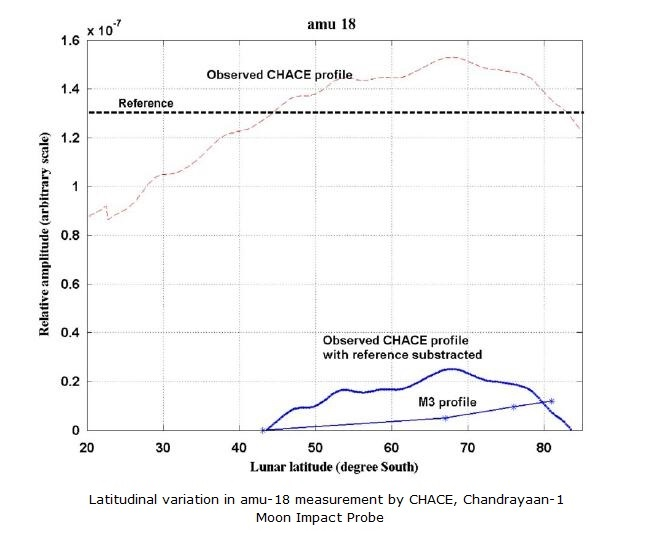
Direct evidence of lunar water in the Moon atmosphere obtained by the Chandrayaan-1's Altitudinal Composition (CHACE) output profile

- Chandrasekhar limit: Subramanyan Chandrasekhar discovered the maximum mass of a stable white dwarf star.
- Lunar water – Although the presence of water ice on the Moon has been conjectured by various scientists since the 1960s, inconclusive evidence of free water ice had also been identified. The first incontrovertible evidence of water on the Moon was provided by the payload Chace carried by the Moon Impact Probe released by Chandrayaan-1 in 2009, confirmed and established by NASA.
- Quasi-normal modes of black holes – C. V. Vishveshwara discovered the quasi-normal modes of black holes. These modes of black hole vibrations are one of the main targets of observation using the gravitational wave detector.
- Saha ionisation equation – The Saha equation, derived by the Bengali scientist Meghnad Saha (6 October 1893 – 16 February 1956) in 1920, conceptualises ionisations in context of stellar atmospheres.

== See also ==
- Timeline of Indian innovation
- History of science and technology in India
- Timeline of historic inventions
- List of Indian mathematicians
- List of Indian scientists
- List of Indian physicists

== Bibliography ==
- Adas, Michael (January 2001). Agricultural and Pastoral Societies in Ancient and Classical History. Temple University Press. ISBN 1-56639-832-0.
- Addington, Larry H. (1990). The Patterns of War Through the Eighteenth Century (Illustrated edition). Indiana: Indiana University Press. ISBN 0-253-20551-4.
- Alter, J. S. in "Kabaddi, a national sport of India". Dyck, Noel (2000). Games, Sports and Cultures. Berg Publishers: ISBN 1-85973-317-4.
- Amma, T. A. Sarasvati (1999) [1979]. Geometry in Ancient and Medieval India. Delhi: Motilal Banarsidass Publication. ISBN 81-208-1344-8.
- Arensberg, Conrad M. & Niehoff, Arthur H. (1971). Introducing Social Change: A Manual for Community Development (second edition). New Jersey: Aldine Transaction. ISBN 0-202-01072-4
- Asher, Frederick M. (2015). Nalanda: Situating the Great Monastery. Marga. ISBN 978-93-83243-07-5.
- Augustyn, Frederick J. (2004). Dictionary of toys and games in American popular culture. Haworth Press. ISBN 0-7890-1504-8.
- Azzaroli, Augusto (1985). An Early History of Horsemanship. Massachusetts: Brill Academic Publishers. ISBN 90-04-07233-0.
- Baber, Zaheer (1996). The Science of Empire: Scientific Knowledge, Civilization, and Colonial Rule in India. State University of New York Press. ISBN 0-7914-2919-9.
- Bag, A. K. (2005). "Fathullah Shirazi: Cannon, Multi-barrel Gun and Yarghu". Indian Journal of History of Science. 40 (3): 431–6.
- Balasubramaniam, R. (2002). Delhi Iron Pillar: New Insights. Delhi: Indian Institute of Advanced Studies [University of Michigan]. ISBN 81-7305-223-9.
- Banerji, Sures Chandra (1989). A Companion to Sanskrit Literature. Motilal Banarsidass. ISBN 81-208-0063-X.
- Barker, Dian (2003). Tibetan Prayer Flags. Connections Book Publishing. ISBN 1-85906-106-0.
- Barua, Pradeep (2005). The State at War in South Asia. Nebraska: University of Nebraska Press. ISBN 0-8032-1344-1.
- Basham, A. L. (2001) [1967]. The Wonder That was India. Third revised edition. New Delhi: Rupa & co. ISBN 0-283-99257-3.
- Bedini, Silvio A. (1994). The Trail of Time : Time Measurement with Incense in East Asia. England: Cambridge University Press. ISBN 0-521-37482-0.
- Bell, Eric Temple (1992). The Development of Mathematics (originally published in 1945). Courier Dover Publications. ISBN 0-486-27239-7.
- Bell, John (2000). Strings, Hands, Shadows: A Modern Puppet History. Wayne State University Press. ISBN 0-89558-156-6.
- Beer, Robert (2004). Encyclopedia of Tibetan Symbols and Motifs. Serindia Publications Inc. ISBN 1-932476-10-5.
- Bird, Henry Edward (1893). Chess History and Reminiscences. London. (Republished version by Forgotten Books). ISBN 1-60620-897-7.
- Berndt, Bruce C.; Rankin, Robert Alexander (2001). Ramanujan: Essays and Surveys. Rhode Island: American Mathematical Society. ISBN 978-0-8218-2624-9.
- Biswas, Arun Kumar (June 1986). "Rasa-Ratna-Samuccaya and Mineral Processing State-of-Art in the 13th Century A.D. India" (PDF). Indian Journal of History of Science. 22 (1): 29–46. Archived from the original (PDF) on 27 February 2009.
- Blechynden, Kathleen (1905). Calcutta, Past and Present. Los Angeles: University of California.
- Bondyopadhyay, Probir K (September 1998). "Sir J C Bose's Diode Detector Received Marconi's First Transatlantic Wireless Signal of December 1901 (The 'Italian Navy Coherer' Scandal Revisited)". IETE Technical Review. 15 (5): 377–406. doi:10.1080/02564602.1998.11416773.
- Boga, Steven (1996). Badminton. Pennsylvania: Stackpole Books. ISBN 0-8117-2487-5
- Boos, Dennis D.; Oliver, Jacqueline M. Hughes (August 1998). "Applications of Basu's Theorem" (PDF). The American Statistician. 52 (3): 218–221. doi:10.2307/2685927. JSTOR 2685927.
- Borwein, Jonathan M. & Bailey, David H. (2004) Mathematics by Experiment: Plausible Reasoning in the 21st Century Massachusetts: A K Peters, Ltd. ISBN 1-56881-211-6
- Bourbaki, Nicolas (1998). Elements of the History of Mathematics. Berlin, Heidelberg, and New York: Springer-Verlag. ISBN 3-540-64767-8.
- Bressoud, David (2002), "Was Calculus Invented in India?", The College Mathematics Journal (Mathematical Association of America) 33 (1): 2–13
- Broadbent, T. A. A.; Kline, M. (October 1968). "Reviewed work(s): The History of Ancient Indian Mathematics by C. N. Srinivasiengar". The Mathematical Gazette. 52 (381): 307–8. doi:10.2307/3614212. JSTOR 3614212. S2CID 176660647.
- Brown, W. Norman (1964). "The Indian Games of Pachisi, Chaupar, and Chausar". Expedition, 32–35. University of Pennsylvania Museum of Archaeology and Anthropology. 32 (35).
- Chamberlin, J. Edward (2007). Horse: How the Horse Has Shaped Civilizations. Moscow: Olma Media Group. ISBN 1-904955-36-3.
- Chandra, Anjana Motihar (2007). India Condensed: 5000 Years of History & Culture Marshall Cavendish. ISBN 981-261-350-1
- Chopra, Ananda S. (2003). "Āyurveda". Medicine Across Cultures. Science Across Cultures: The History of Non-Western Science. Vol. 3. pp. 75–83. doi:10.1007/0-306-48094-8_4. ISBN 1-4020-1166-0.
- Dwivedi, Girish; Dwivedi, Shridhar (2007). "History of Medicine: Sushruta – the Clinician – Teacher par Excellence" (PDF). Indian Journal of Chest Diseases and Allied Sciences. 49. Delhi, India: Vallabhbhai Patel Chest Institute, U. of Delhi / National College of Chest Physicians: 243–244. Archived from the original (PDF) on 10 October 2008. (Republished by National Informatics Centre, Government of India.)
- Cooke, Roger (2005). The History of Mathematics: A Brief Course. New York: Wiley-Interscience. ISBN 0-471-44459-6.
- Connors, Martin; Dupuis, Diane L. & Morgan, Brad (1992). The Olympics Factbook: A Spectator's Guide to the Winter and Summer Games. Michigan: Visible Ink Press. ISBN 0-8103-9417-0
- Coppa, A.; Bondioli, L.; Cucina, A.; Frayer, D. W.; Jarrige, C.; Jarrige, J. -F.; Quivron, G.; Rossi, M.; Vidale, M.; Macchiarelli, R. (April 2006). "Early Neolithic tradition of dentistry". Nature. 440 (7085): 755–756. doi:10.1038/440755a. PMID 16598247.
- Craddock, P.T. et al. (1983). Zinc production in medieval India, World Archaeology, vol. 15, no. 2, Industrial Archaeology.
- Crandall, R.; Papadopoulos, J. (18 March 2003). On the Implementation of AKS-Class Primality Tests (PDF) (Preprint).
- Crandall, Richard E. & Pomerance, Carl (2005). Prime Numbers: A Computational Perspective (second edition). New York: Springer. ISBN 0-387-25282-7.
- Dadhich, Naresh (August 2005). "Amal Kumar Raychaudhuri (1923–2005)" (PDF). Current Science. 89 (3): 569–570.
- Dales, George (1974). "Excavations at Balakot, Pakistan, 1973". Journal of Field Archaeology. 1 (1–2): 3–22 [10]. doi:10.2307/529703. JSTOR 529703.
- Daryaee, Touraj (2006) in "Backgammon" in Medieval Islamic Civilization: An Encyclopedia ed. Meri, Josef W. & Bacharach, Jere L, pp. 88–89. Taylor & Francis.
- Dauxois, Thierry & Peyrard, Michel (2006). Physics of Solitons. England: Cambridge University Press. ISBN 0-521-85421-0.
- Davreu, Robert (1978). "Cities of Mystery: The Lost Empire of the Indus Valley". The World's Last Mysteries. (second edition). Sydney: Reader's Digest. ISBN 0-909486-61-1
- Dickinson, Joan Y. (2001). The Book of Diamonds. Dover Publications. ISBN 0-486-41816-2.
- Drewes, F. (2006). Grammatical Picture Generation: A Tree-based Approach. New York: Springer. ISBN 3-540-21304-X
- Durant, Will (1935). Our Oriental Heritage. New York: Simon and Schuster.
- Dutfield, Graham (2003). Intellectual Property Rights and the Life Science Industries: A Twentieth Century History. Ashgate Publishing. ISBN 0-7546-2111-1.
- Dwivedi, Girish & Dwivedi, Shridhar (2007). History of Medicine: Sushruta – the Clinician – Teacher par Excellence. National Informatics Centre (Government of India).
- Emerson, D.T. (1998).The Work of Jagdish Chandra Bose: 100 years of mm-wave research. National Radio Astronomy Observatory.
- Emsley, John (2003). Nature's Building Blocks: An A-Z Guide to the Elements. England: Oxford University Press. ISBN 0-19-850340-7.
- Finger, Stanley (2001). Origins of Neuroscience: A History of Explorations into Brain Function. England: Oxford University Press. ISBN 0-19-514694-8.
- Flegg, Graham (2002). Numbers: Their History and Meaning. Courier Dover Publications. ISBN 0-486-42165-1.
- Forbes, Duncan (1860). The History of Chess: From the Time of the Early Invention of the Game in India Till the Period of Its Establishment in Western and Central Europe. London: W. H. Allen & co.
- Fowler, David (1996). "Binomial Coefficient Function". The American Mathematical Monthly. 103 (1): 1–17. doi:10.1080/00029890.1996.12004694. JSTOR 2975209.
- Fraser, Gordon (2006). The New Physics for the Twenty-first Century. England: Cambridge University Press. ISBN 0-521-81600-9.
- Gangopadhyaya, Mrinalkanti (1980). Indian Atomism: history and sources. New Jersey: Humanities Press. ISBN 0-391-02177-X.
- Geddes, Patrick (2000). The life and work of Sir Jagadis C. Bose. Asian Educational Services. ISBN 81-206-1457-7.
- Geyer, H. S. (2006), Global Regionalization: Core Peripheral Trends. England: Edward Elgar Publishing. ISBN 1-84376-905-0.
- Ghosh, Amalananda, ed. (1990). An Encyclopaedia of Indian Archaeology. BRILL. ISBN 978-90-04-09264-8.
- Ghosh, S.; Massey, Reginald; and Banerjee, Utpal Kumar (2006). Indian Puppets: Past, Present and Future. Abhinav Publications. ISBN 81-7017-435-X.
- Gottsegen, Mark E. (2006). The Painter's Handbook: A Complete Reference. New York: Watson-Guptill Publications. ISBN 0-8230-3496-8.
- Goonatilake, Susantha (1998). Toward a Global Science: Mining Civilizational Knowledge. Indiana: Indiana University Press. ISBN 0-253-33388-1.
- Guillain, Jean-Yves (2004). Badminton: An Illustrated History. Paris: Editions Publibook ISBN 2-7483-0572-8
- Hāṇḍā, Omacanda (1998). Textiles, Costumes, and Ornaments of the Western Himalaya. Indus Publishing. ISBN 81-7387-076-4.
- Hayashi, Takao (2005). Indian Mathematics in Flood, Gavin, The Blackwell Companion to Hinduism, Oxford: Basil Blackwell, 616 pages, pp. 360–375, 360–375, ISBN 978-1-4051-3251-0.
- Hershey, J. Willard (2004). The Book of Diamonds: Their Curious Lore, Properties, Tests and Synthetic Manufacture 1940 Montana: Kessinger Publishing. ISBN 1-4179-7715-9
- Hobson, John M. (2004). The Eastern Origins of Western Civilisation (Illustrated edition). England: Cambridge University Press. ISBN 0-521-54724-5.
- Hoiberg, Dale & Ramchandani, Indu (2000). Students' Britannica India. Mumbai: Popular Prakashan. ISBN 0-85229-760-2
- Hooper, David Vincent; Whyld, Kenneth (1992). The Oxford Companion to Chess. Oxford University Press. ISBN 0-19-866164-9.
- Hoover, Herbert Clark (2003). Georgius Agricola De Re Metallica Montana: Kessinger Publishing. ISBN 0-7661-3197-1.
- Hopkins, Donald R. (2002). The Greatest Killer: Smallpox in history. University of Chicago Press. ISBN 0-226-35168-8.
- Ifrah, Georges (2000). A Universal History of Numbers: From Prehistory to Computers. New York: Wiley. ISBN 0-471-39340-1.
- Ingerman, P. Z. (1967). "Panini-Backus form suggested". Communications of the ACM. 10 (3): 137. doi:10.1145/363162.363165. S2CID 52817672.
- Iwata, Shigeo (2008), "Weights and Measures in the Indus Valley", Encyclopaedia of the History of Science, Technology, and Medicine in Non-Western Cultures (2nd edition) edited by Helaine Selin, Springer, 2254–2255, ISBN 978-1-4020-4559-2.
- James, Jeffrey (2003). Bridging the Global Digital Divide. Cheltenham: Edward Elgar Publishing. ISBN 1-84376-206-4.
- Jones, William (1807). The Works of Sir William Jones (Volume 4). London.
- Joseph, George G. (2000). The Crest of the Peacock: Non-European Roots of Mathematics. Princeton University Press. ISBN 978-0-691-00659-8.
- Juleff, G (1996). "An ancient wind powered iron smelting technology in Sri Lanka". Nature. 379 (6560): 60–63. Bibcode:1996Natur.379...60J. doi:10.1038/379060a0. S2CID 205026185.
- Kamarustafa, Ahmet T. (1992). "Part 1 No. 1: Islamic Cartography 1". Cartography in the Traditional Islamic and South Asian Societies. Vol. 2 Book 1. New York: Oxford University Press US. ISBN 0-226-31635-1
- Katz, V. J. (1995). "Ideas of Calculus in Islam and India". Mathematics Magazine. 68 (3): 163–174. doi:10.2307/2691411. JSTOR 2691411.
- Kearns, Susannah C.J. & Nash, June E. (2008). leprosy. Encyclopædia Britannica.
- Kieschnick, John (2003). The Impact of Buddhism on Chinese Material Culture. New Jersey: Princeton University Press. ISBN 0-691-09676-7.
- Kipfer, Barbara Ann (2000). Encyclopedic Dictionary of Archaeology. (Illustrated edition). New York: Springer. ISBN 978-0-306-46158-3.
- Koppel, Tom (2007). Ebb and Flow: Tides and Life on Our Once and Future Planet. Dundurn Press Ltd. ISBN 1-55002-726-3.
- Knuth, Donald (2005). Generating All Tuples and Permutations. The Art of Computer Programming. Vol. 4. Addison–Wesley. ISBN 978-0-201-85393-3. Fascicle 2, first printing.
- Kriger, Colleen E. & Connah, Graham (2006). Cloth in West African History. Rowman Altamira. ISBN 0-7591-0422-0.
- Kumar, Narendra (2004). Science in Ancient India. Delhi: Anmol Publications Pvt Ltd. ISBN 81-261-2056-8
- Kumar, Pintu (2018). Buddhist Learning in South Asia: Education, Religion, and Culture at the Ancient Sri Nalanda Mahavihara. Lexington Books.
- Kumar, Yukteshwar (2005). A History of Sino-Indian Relations: 1st Century A.D. to 7th Century A.D. New Delhi: APH Publishing. ISBN 81-7648-798-8.
- Lade, Arnie & Svoboda, Robert (2000). Chinese Medicine and Ayurveda. Motilal Banarsidass. ISBN 81-208-1472-X.
- Lee, Sunggyu (2006). Encyclopedia of Chemical Processing. CRC Press. ISBN 0-8247-5563-4.
- Linde, Antonius van der (1981) [1874] (in German). Geschichte und Literatur des Schachspiels. Zürich: Edition Olms. ISBN 3-283-00079-4
- Livingston, Morna & Beach, Milo (2002). Steps to Water: The Ancient Stepwells of India. Princeton Architectural Press. ISBN 1-56898-324-7.
- Lock, Stephen; Last, John M.; Dunea, George (2001). The Oxford Illustrated Companion to Medicine. USA: Oxford University Press. ISBN 0-19-262950-6.
- Lowie, Robert H. (2007) [1940]. An Introduction To Cultural Anthropology. Masterson Press. ISBN 1-4067-1765-7.
- Malkin, Stephen (1996). Grinding Technology: Theory and Applications of Machining with Abrasives. Michigan: Society of Manufacturing Engineers. ISBN 0-87263-480-9.
- Mayall, R.N.; Mayall, M.W. (1994) [1938]. Sundials: Their construction and use (3rd ed.). Cambridge, MA: Sky Publishing. ISBN 0-933346-71-9.
- McEvilley, Thomas (2002). The Shape of Ancient Thought: Comparative Studies in Greek and Indian Philosophies. New York: Allworth Communications Inc. ISBN 1-58115-203-5.
- McIntosh, Jane (2007). The Ancient Indus Valley: New Perspectives. Illustrated edition. California: ABC-CLIO. ISBN 1-57607-907-4.
- Meri, Josef W. (2005). Medieval Islamic Civilization: An Encyclopedia. Routledge. ISBN 0-415-96690-6.
- Millar, Stuart (2004). "Using Technology: Handheld PC Bridges Digital Divide". World in Motion: Future, Science and Technology. Denmark: Systime. pp. 167–169. ISBN 87-616-0887-4
- Murray, H. J. R. (1913). A History of Chess. England: Oxford University Press.
- Narlikar, J. V. (2002). An Introduction to Cosmology. Cambridge University Press. ISBN 0-521-79376-9.
- Nejat, Karen Rhea Nemet. (1998). Daily Life in Ancient Mesopotamia. Connecticut: Greenwood Publishing Group. ISBN 0-313-29497-6.
- Nitis, Mukhopadhyay (2000). Probability and Statistical Inference. Statistics: A Series of Textbooks and Monographs. 162. Florida: CRC Press USA. ISBN 0-8247-0379-0.
- Pacey, Arnold (1991). Technology in World Civilization: A Thousand-year History. MIT Press. ISBN 0-262-66072-5.
- Penney, Lord (November 1967). "Homi Jehangir Bhabha. 1909–1966". Biographical Memoirs of Fellows of the Royal Society. 13 (13): 35–55. doi:10.1098/rsbm.1967.0002. JSTOR 769371.
- Piercey, W. Douglas & Scarborough, Harold (2008). hospital. Encyclopædia Britannica.
- Pingree, David (2003). "The logic of non-Western science: mathematical discoveries in medieval India". Daedalus. 132 (4): 45–54. doi:10.1162/001152603771338779. S2CID 57559157. Archived from the original on 24 October 2010 – via Questia.
- Pinkney, Andrea Marion (1 July 2015). "Looking West to India: Asian education, intra-Asian renaissance, and the Nalanda revival". Modern Asian Studies. 49 (1): 111–149. doi:10.1017/S0026749X13000310. S2CID 144865654.
- Plofker, Kim (November 2001). "The 'Error' in the Indian 'aylor Series Approximation' to the Sine". Historia Mathematica. 28 (4): 283–295. doi:10.1006/hmat.2001.2331.
- Ploker, Kim (2007) "Mathematics in India". The Mathematics of Egypt, Mesopotamia, China, India, and Islam: A Sourcebook New Jersey: Princeton University Press. ISBN 0-691-11485-4
- Ponomarev, Leonid Ivanovich (1993). The Quantum Dice. CRC Press. ISBN 0-7503-0251-8.
- Possehl, Gregory L. (2002). The Indus Civilization: A Contemporary Perspective. Maryland: Rowman Altamira. ISBN 0-7591-0172-8.
- Prathap, Gangan (March 2004). "Indian science slows down: The decline of open-ended research". Current Science. 86 (6): 768–769.
- Pruthi, Raj (2004). Prehistory and Harappan Civilization. New Delhi: APH Publishing Corp. ISBN 81-7648-581-0.
- Purohit, Vinayak (1988). Arts of Transitional India Twentieth Century. Mumbai: Popular Prakashan. ISBN 0-86132-138-3
- Puttaswamy, T. K. (2000), "The Mathematical Accomplishments of Ancient Indian Mathematicians". Mathematics Across Cultures: The History of Non-western Mathematics. New York: Springer Publishing. ISBN 0-7923-6481-3
- Ramakrishnan, C. (October 2001). "In Memoriam: Professor G.N. Ramachandran (1922–2001)" (PDF). Protein Science. 10 (8): 1689–1691. doi:10.1002/pro.101689. PMC 2374078. PMID 11468366.
- Rao, S. R. (1985). Lothal. Archaeological Survey of India.
- Rao, K. Anantharama (2000). Vision 21st Century. India: Vidya Publishing House [Michigan: University of Michigan]. ISBN 81-87699-00-0
- Read, Peter G. (2005) Gemmology. England: Butterworth-Heinemann. ISBN 0-7506-6449-5
- Reynolds, Terry S (1983). Stronger Than a Hundred Men: A History of the Vertical Water Wheel. Johns Hopkins University Press. ISBN 0-8018-7248-0.
- Rigden, John S. (2005). Einstein 1905: The Standard of Greatness. Cambridge, Massachusetts: Harvard University Press. ISBN 0-674-01544-4.
- Rinzler, CA (2009). The Encyclopedia of Cosmetic and Plastic Surgery. New York City: Facts on File.
- Robinson, Dindy & Estes, Rebecca (1996). World Cultures Through Art Activities. New Hampshire: Libraries Unlimited. ISBN 1-56308-271-3.
- Rodda & Ubertini (2004). The Basis of Civilization—water Science?. International Association of Hydrological Science. ISBN 1-901502-57-0.
- Rohr, R.R.J. (1996) [1965, 1970]. Sundials: History, theory, and practice. Translated by Godin, G. (reprint ed.). New York, NY: Dover. ISBN 0-486-29139-1 – via Internet Archive.
- Rousselet, Louis (1875). India and Its Native Princes: Travels in Central India and in the Presidencies of Bombay and Bengal. London: Chapman and Hall.
- Roy, Ranjan (December 1990). "The Discovery of the Series Formula for π by Leibniz, Gregory and Nilakantha". Mathematics Magazine. 63 (5): 291–306. doi:10.1080/0025570X.1990.11977541.
- Saliba, George (1997). "Interfusion of Asian and Western Cultures: Islamic Civilization and Europe to 1500". Asia in Western and World History: A Guide for Teaching. Edited by Ainslie Thomas Embree & Carol Gluck. New York: M.E. Sharpe. ISBN 1-56324-265-6.
- Sanchez & Canton (2006). Microcontroller Programming: The Microchip PIC. CRC Press. ISBN 0-8493-7189-9.
- Sarkar, Tapan K. etc. (2006), History of Wireless, Wiley-IEEE, ISBN 0-471-78301-3.
- Schafer, Edward H. (1963). The Golden Peaches of Samarkand: A Study of T'ang Exotics. California: University of California Press. ISBN 0-520-05462-8.
- Schwartzberg, Joseph E. (1992). "Part 2: South Asian Cartography: 15. Introduction to South Asian Cartography". The History of Cartography – Cartography in the Traditional Islamic and South Asian Societies (Volume 2 Book 1). Edited by J.B. Harley and David Woodward. New York: Oxford University Press USA. ISBN 0-226-31635-1.
- Seiwert, Hubert Michael (2003). Popular Religious Movements and Heterodox Sects in Chinese History. Massachusetts: Brill Academic Publishers. ISBN 90-04-13146-9.
- Shukla, R.P. in "Laser Interferometers for Measuring Refractive Index of Transparent Materials and Testing of Optical Components", Laser Applications in Material Science and Industry. 20–27. Allied Publishers. ISBN 81-7023-658-4.
- Singh, A. N. (1936). "On the Use of Series in Hindu Mathematics". Osiris. 1: 606–628. doi:10.1086/368443. JSTOR 301627.
- Singh, Manpal (2005). Modern Teaching of Mathematics. Delhi: Anmol Publications Pvt Ltd. ISBN 81-261-2105-X
- Singh, P. (1985). The So-called Fibonacci numbers in ancient and medieval India. Historia Mathematica 12(3), 229–44.
- Sircar, D.C. (1996).Indian epigraphy. Motilal Banarsidass. ISBN 81-208-1166-6.
- Sivaramakrishnan, V. M. (2001). Tobacco and Areca Nut. Hyderabad: Orient Blackswan. ISBN 81-250-2013-6
- Smith, Joseph A. (1992). The Pen and Ink Book: Materials and Techniques for Today's Artist. New York: Watson-Guptill Publications. ISBN 0-8230-3986-2.
- Smith, David E. (1958). History of Mathematics. Courier Dover Publications. ISBN 0-486-20430-8.
- Sreekantan, B. V. (December 2005). "Homi Bhabha and Cosmic Ray research in India". Resonance. 10 (12): 42–51. doi:10.1007/BF02835127.
- Srinivasan, S. & Ranganathan, S. Wootz Steel: An Advanced Material of the Ancient World. Bangalore: Indian Institute of Science.
- Srinivasan, S (15 November 1994). "Wootz Crucible Steel: A Newly Discovered Production Site in South India". Papers from the Institute of Archaeology. 5: 49–59. doi:10.5334/pia.60.
- Srinivasan, S. and Griffiths, D. South Indian wootz: evidence for high-carbon steel from crucibles from a newly identified site and preliminary comparisons with related finds. Material Issues in Art and Archaeology-V, Materials Research Society Symposium Proceedings Series Vol. 462.
- Staal, Frits (1999). "Greek and Vedic Geometry". Journal of Indian Philosophy. 27 (1–2): 105–127. doi:10.1023/A:1004364417713. S2CID 170894641.
- Stcherbatsky, Theodore (2003) [1930]. Buddhist Logic. Vol. 1. Montana: Kessinger Publishing. ISBN 978-0-7661-7684-3.
- Stein, Burton (1998). A History of India. Blackwell Publishing. ISBN 0-631-20546-2.
- Stepanov, Serguei A. (1999). Codes on Algebraic Curves. Springer. ISBN 0-306-46144-7.
- Stillwell, John (2004). Mathematics and its History (2 ed.). Berlin and New York: Springer, 568 pages. ISBN 0-387-95336-1.
- Taguchi, Genichi & Jugulum, Rajesh (2002). The Mahalanobis-taguchi Strategy: A Pattern Technology System. John Wiley and Sons. ISBN 0-471-02333-7.
- Teresi, Dick; et al. (2002). Lost Discoveries: The Ancient Roots of Modern Science—from the Babylonians to the Maya. New York: Simon & Schuster. ISBN 0-684-83718-8.
- Thomas, Arthur (2007) Gemstones: Properties, Identification and Use. London: New Holland Publishers. ISBN 1-84537-602-1
- Thrusfield, Michael (2007). Veterinary Epidemiology. Blackwell Publishing. ISBN 1-4051-5627-9.
- Upadhyaya, Bhagwat Saran (1954). The Ancient World. Andhra Pradesh: The Institute of Ancient Studies Hyderabad.
- Varadpande, Manohar Laxman (2005). History of Indian Theatre. New Delhi: Abhinav Publications. ISBN 81-7017-430-9.
- Wenk, Hans-Rudolf; et al. (2003). Minerals: Their Constitution and Origin. England: Cambridge University Press. ISBN 0-521-52958-1.
- Whish, Charles (1835). "On the Hindu Quadrature of the Circle, and the infinite Series of the proportion of the circumference to the diameter exhibited in the four shastras: the Tantra Sangraham, Yukti-Bhasa, Carana Padhati, and Sadratnamala". Transactions of the Royal Asiatic Society of Great Britain and Ireland. 3 (3): 509–523. doi:10.1017/S0950473700001221.
- White, Lynn Townsend Jr. (1960). "Tibet, India, and Malaya as Sources of Western Medieval Technology". The American Historical Review. 65 (3): 522–526. doi:10.2307/1849619. JSTOR 1849619.
- Whitelaw, Ian (2007). A Measure of All Things: The Story of Man and Measurement. Macmillan. ISBN 0-312-37026-1.
- Wilkinson, Charles K (1943). "Chessmen and Chess". The Metropolitan Museum of Art Bulletin. New Series. 1 (9): 271–279. doi:10.2307/3257111. JSTOR 3257111.
- Wise, Tad (2002). Blessings on the Wind: The Mystery & Meaning of Tibetan Prayer Flags. Chronicle Books. ISBN 0-8118-3435-2.
- Wisseman, S. U. & Williams, W. S. (1994). Ancient Technologies and Archaeological Materials. London: Routledge. ISBN 2-88124-632-X.
- Woods, Michael & Woods, Mary B. (2000). Ancient Transportation: From Camels to Canals. Minnesota: Twenty-First Century Books. ISBN 0-8225-2993-9.
