= Chilli Potato =

Indian-Chinese street food

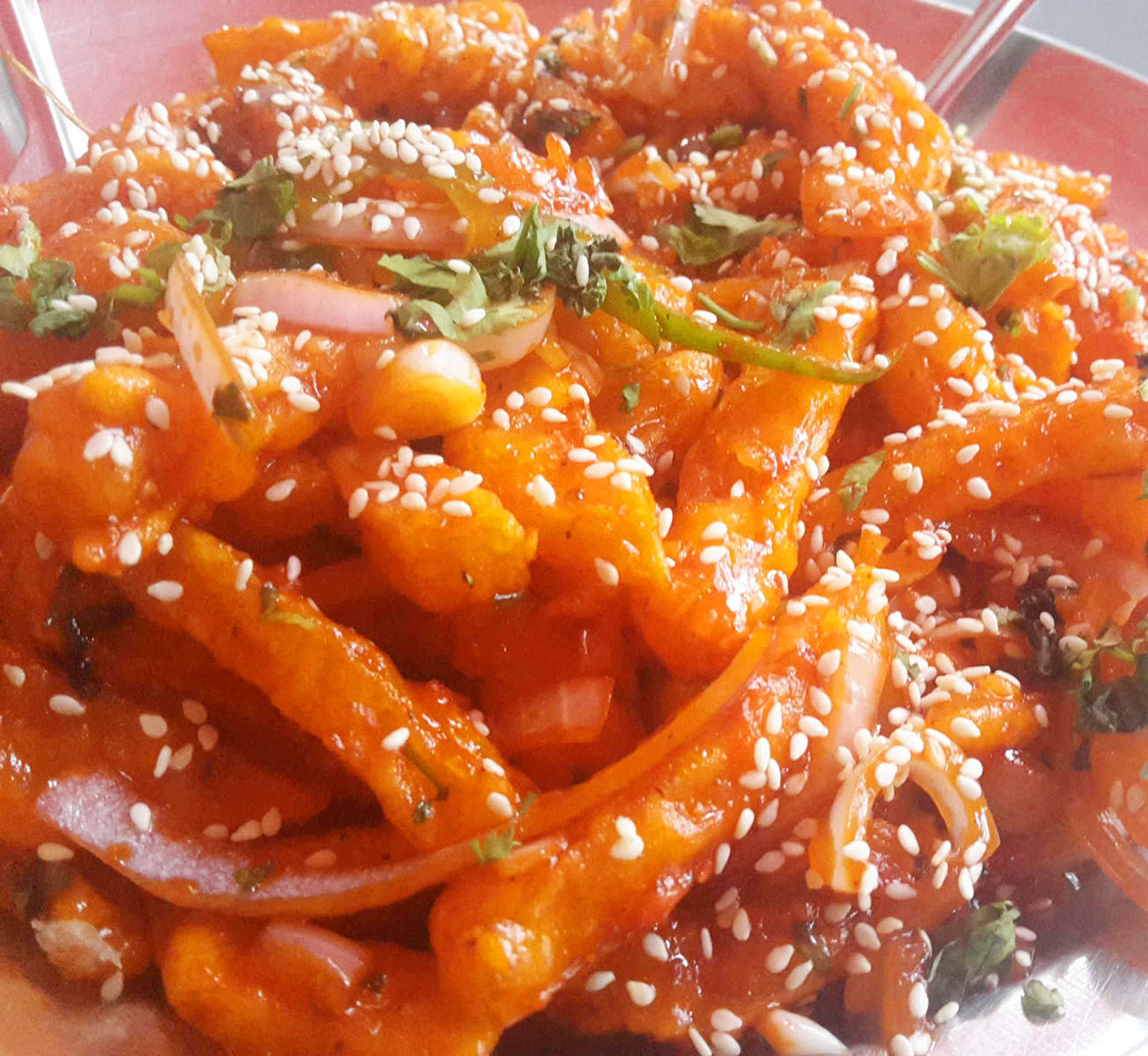
- Course: Appetizer, or Main course
- Place of origin: India

Chilli Potato is a dish from Indo-Chinese cuisine consisting of deep-fried potato strips tossed in a spicy, tangy sauce. It is a common street food across the Indian subcontinent, a fusion cuisine that developed in Kolkata through the adaptation of Chinese cooking techniques to Indian ingredients. The dish appears in two main forms: a dry version served as a starter, and a gravy version to accompany rice or noodles.

== History ==
Indo-Chinese cuisine developed in Kolkata through the Chinese migrant communities that settled in the city from the late 18th century onward. Hakka migrants worked primarily as cobblers and tanners around Tangra; Cantonese migrants worked largely as carpenters; others established themselves as dentists and traders. Central Kolkata's Tiretti Bazaar was the city's original Chinatown.

A key development in the flavour profile of Chilli Potato and related dishes was the 1958 founding of Pou Chong Foods by Lee Shih Chuan in Tangra. Lee developed a green chilli sauce by blending Indian and Chinese herbs, which became a staple ingredient in Indo-Chinese cooking across India.

== Preparation ==
Starchy potatoes are cut into finger-length strips and coated in cornflour or rice flour before frying. The aromatics are garlic, ginger, and green chillies. The sauce consists of soy sauce, vinegar, and tomato ketchup, sometimes with added chilli sauce.

Potato strips are commonly parboiled before frying. A double-frying method is often used: a first fry at 160–170 °C cooks the potato through; a second fry at around 180 °C produces the browned exterior via the Maillard reaction. The fried potatoes are then tossed in a hot wok with the aromatics and sauce.

== Variations ==
Honey Chilli Potato adds honey to the sauce to produce a sweet-spicy glaze, usually garnished with sesame seeds. It is more calorie-dense than the standard preparation.

The gravy version uses a cornflour slurry to thicken the sauce, making it suitable as a side dish with fried rice or noodles rather than as a standalone starter.

The Hakka-style version typically uses baby potatoes and white pepper in place of the standard preparation.

== Sociocultural impact ==
The dish spread beyond Kolkata alongside the broader growth of Indo-Chinese street food, as restaurateurs from Kolkata opened establishments in Delhi, Mumbai, and other cities. It became a common street food in the late 1990s and early 2000s. Delhi, particularly areas such as North Campus and Hauz Khas, developed a strong association with the dish outside Bengal.

== Nutrition ==
As a deep-fried dish, Chilli Potato is calorie-dense. A standard serving is estimated at approximately 300 kcal, varying by preparation method and serving size. Monosodium glutamate (MSG) is widely used in the dish and is permitted by the Food Safety and Standards Authority of India.

== See also ==
- Indo-Chinese cuisine
- Chinese people in India
- Chilli chicken
- Gobi Manchurian
