= Stephen Malkin =

American engineer (1941–2013)

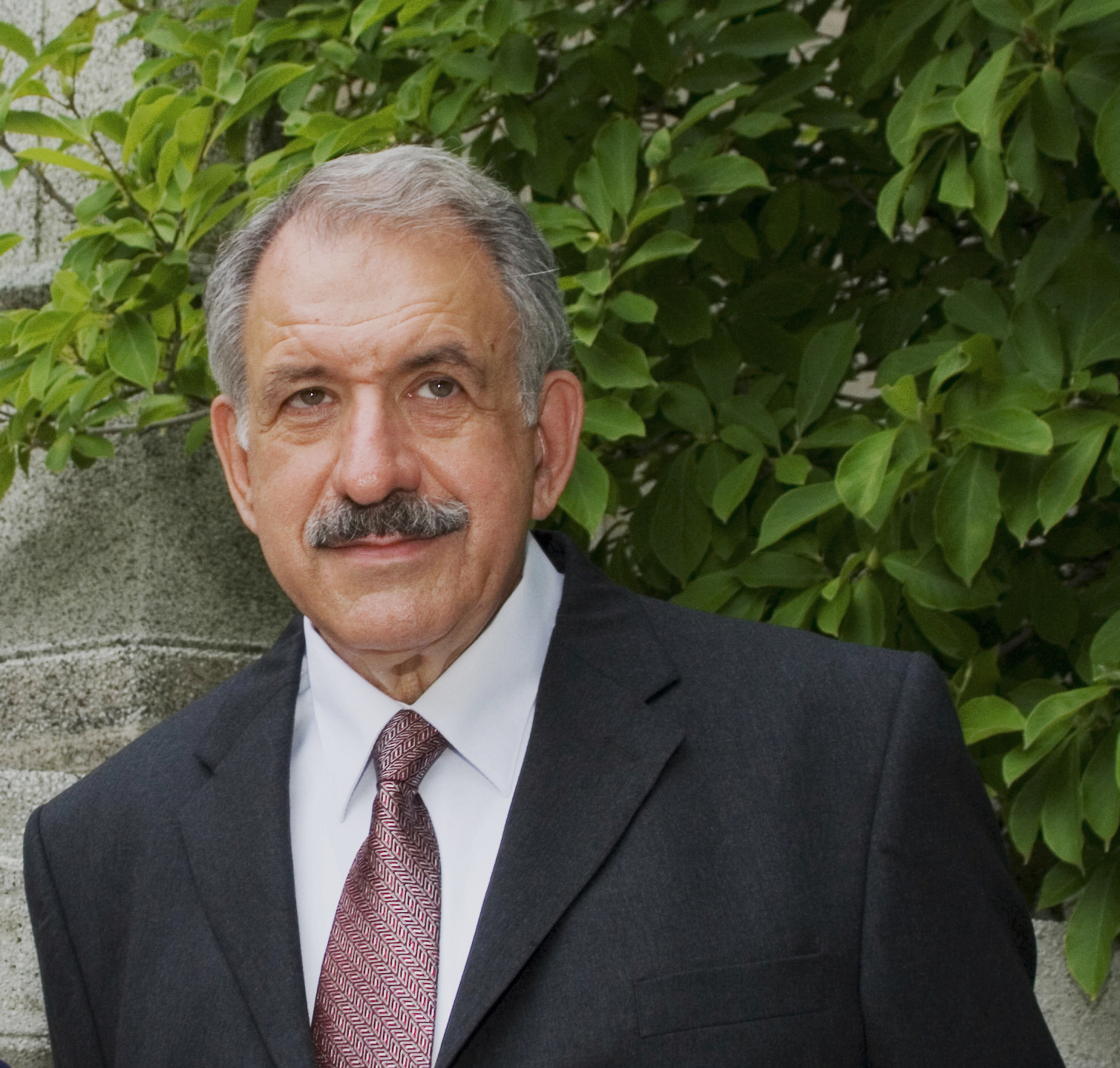
- Born: June 20, 1941; Malden, Massachusetts, U.S.
- Died: August 19, 2013 (aged 72)
- Education: Massachusetts Institute of Technology
- Scientific career
- Fields: grinding and abrasive processes
- Workplaces: University of Massachusetts Amherst; Technion – Israel Institute of Technology

Stephen Malkin (June 20, 1941 – August 19, 2013) was an American engineer. He taught at the University of Texas at Austin, the University at Buffalo, the University of Massachusetts Amherst, and Technion – Israel Institute of Technology.

Malkin's research work was in manufacturing with a focus on grinding and abrasive processes. He was elected a member of the National Academy of Engineering (NAE), “for pioneering research in and the implementation of grinding-system simulation and optimization”.

Malkin was also a Fellow of the International Institution for Production Engineering (CIRP), a Fellow of the American Society of Mechanical Engineers (ASME), and a Fellow of the Society of Manufacturing Engineering (SME).

== Early life and education ==
Stephen Malkin was born in Malden, Massachusetts and grew up in the Boston area. In 1963 he graduated in Mechanical Engineering from the Massachusetts Institute of Technology (MIT). In 1965 he received his M.S. degree and in 1968 - his Sc.D., both from MIT. His Sc.D. advisor was Nathan Cook, and his thesis topic: “The Wear of Grinding Wheels”.

== Career ==
Malkin joined the Department of Mechanical Engineering at the University of Texas at Austin in 1968, as an assistant professor and was later promoted to associate professor. In 1974 he was an associate professor at the Department of Mechanical Engineering of the State University of New York, Buffalo. In 1976 Malkin joined, as tenured associate professor, the faculty of Mechanical Engineering at Technion - Israel Institute of Technology.

In 1986 Malkin joined the Department of Mechanical and Industrial Engineering at the University of Massachusetts Amherst as a full professor. In 2000 Malkin was appointed as the first Head of the Department of Mechanical & Industrial Engineering, which merged the scholarly activity of two separate departments: Mechanical Engineering and Industrial Engineering. He was the department Head during 2000–2006. Malkin was a Distinguished University Professor from 1998 until he retired in 2008 as a Distinguished Professor Emeritus.

During his career, Malkin was a visiting professor at the Technion, the School of Mechanical and Aerospace Engineering at Cornell University, University of California, Berkeley and at the Indian Institute of Technology, Madras. He was a consultant to more than 35 industrial companies in the USA, Europe, Israel, China, Korea, Japan, India and Brazil.

Malkin was the editor for North America of the Journal of Manufacturing Science and Production during 2003 - 2005, and an associate editor of Trans. ASME, Journal of Engineering for Industry. During his career, Malkin supervised 50 graduate students.

== Research ==
Malkin's main field was manufacturing and materials processing, with special emphasis on grinding and abrasive processes. His early research focused on developing models to describe the grinding process: the mechanics, precision, surface topography, temperatures and thermal wear.

He was the first to develop and demonstrate adaptive control for grinding operations (at the Technion, Israel), which can be practically utilized for enhancing grinding operations in real-time.

He then developed a virtual manufacturing system that provides quantitative and computerized simulation of the grinding process. This system can predict the outcome and calculate the optimal conditions, and is used by the industry. His latest research focused on the grinding process optimization and intelligent control of grinding machines.

== Publications ==
Malkin authored more than 200 scientific papers and a book that had two editions. He held two patents.

=== Books ===
- Malkin, Stephen (1989). Grinding Technology: Theory and Applications of Machining with Abrasives. Society of Manufacturing Engineers. ISBN 978-0-87263-480-0.
- Malkin, S; Guo, Changsheng (2008). Grinding technology: theory and applications of machining with abrasives. New York: Industrial Press. ISBN 978-0-8311-3247-7. OCLC 77708297.

=== Selected articles ===
- S Malkin, NH Cook: The wear of grinding wheels: Part 2–Fracture wear. ASME Journal of Manufacturing Science and Engineering. Vol. 93(4), 1971.
- Malkin, Stephen; Koren, Yoram; Ber, A. (1980). "Off-Line Grinding Optimization with a Micro-Computer". CIRP Annals. 29 (1). Elsevier BV: 213–216. doi:10.1016/s0007-8506(07)61324-9. ISSN 0007-8506.
- Malkin, Stephen (1981). "Grinding Cycle Optimization". CIRP Annals. 30 (1). Elsevier BV: 223–226. doi:10.1016/s0007-8506(07)60930-5. ISSN 0007-8506.
- Amitay, G.; Malkin, S.; Koren, Y. (1981-02-01). "Adaptive Control Optimization of Grinding". Journal of Engineering for Industry. 103 (1). ASME International: 103–108. doi:10.1115/1.3184449. ISSN 0022-0817.
- Malkin, S.; Hwang, T.W. (1996). "Grinding Mechanisms for Ceramics". CIRP Annals. 45 (2). Elsevier BV: 569–580. doi:10.1016/s0007-8506(07)60511-3. ISSN 0007-8506.
- Malkin, S.; Hwang, T.W. (1996). "Grinding Mechanisms for Ceramics". CIRP Annals. 45 (2). Elsevier BV: 569–580. doi:10.1016/s0007-8506(07)60511-3. ISSN 0007-8506.
- Guo, Changsheng; Malkin, Stephen (2000). "Energy Partition and Cooling During Grinding". Journal of Manufacturing Processes. 2 (3). Elsevier BV: 151–157. doi:10.1016/s1526-6125(00)70116-2. ISSN 1526-6125.
- S. Dong, K. Danai, S. Malkin, A Deshmukh: Continuous optimal Infeed control for Cylindrical Plunge Grinding, Part 1: Methodology. ASME J. of Manufacturing Science and Engineering. Vol. 126(2), 2004.
- S. Malkin, C. Guo: Thermal Analysis of grinding. CIRP Annals, Vol 56(2), pp. 760–782, 2007.
- AJ Shih, BL Tai, L. Zhang, S. Sullivan, S. Malkin: Prediction of bond grinding temperature in skull base neurosurgery, CIRP Annals, Vol. 61(1), pp. 307–310, 2012

== Honors and awards ==
- Honorary Doctorate Degree (Doctor Honoris Causa), J. E. Purkyně University, Czech Republic, 2010
- Member, National Academy of Engineering (NAE), 2008
- Founders Lecturer, North American Manufacturing Research Conference, Monterrey, Mexico, 2008
- Life Fellow, American Society of Mechanical Engineers (ASME), 2006
- Honorary Professor, National Huaqiao University, Quanzhou, China, 2001
- Honorary Member, Romanian Society of Mechanical Engineering, 1993
- Fellow, Society of Manufacturing Engineers (SME), 1989
- Fellow, American Society of Mechanical Engineers (ASME), 1987
- Fellow, International Academy for Production Engineering (CIRP), 1980

=== Stephen Malkin Lecture ===
The Mechanical & Industrial Engineering Department at the University of Massachusetts Amherst holds an annual "Stephen Malkin Lecture", that attracts expert speakers in the fields related to Professor Malkin's research. The first Malkin Lecture was in April 2015.

== Personal life ==
Malkin was married to Maccabit (Gross). They raised a son, Gonen, and a daughter, Ruth. He died in 2013 and was buried in Tivon, Israel. A grinding wheel is engraved on the gravestone.
