= Achipur Chinese Temple =

Chinese temple in India

Coordinates: 22.4515°N 88.1289°E

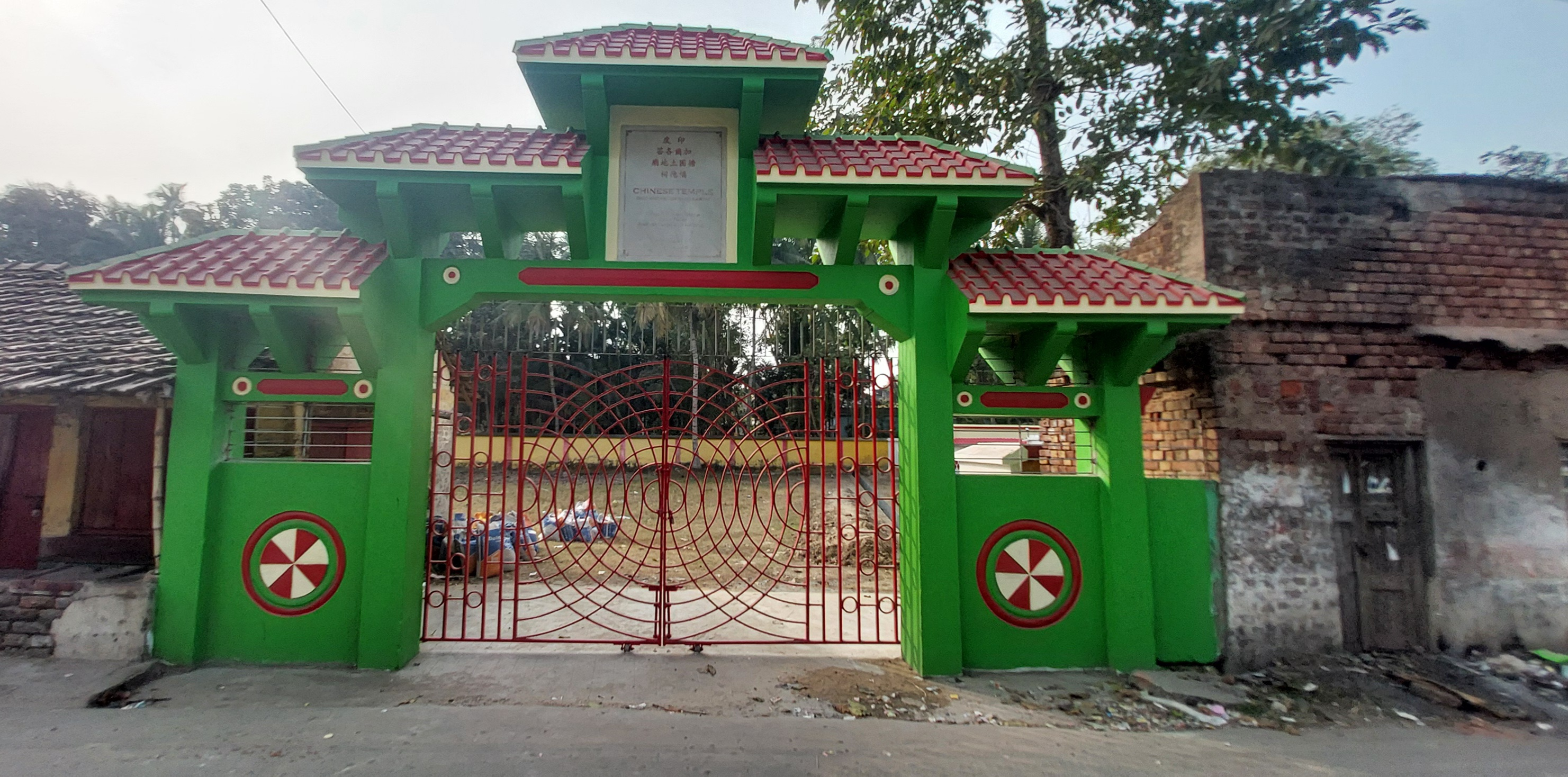
- Gate of Chinese temple, Achipur

Religion
- Ecclesiastical or organisational status: Temple
- Status: Active

Location
- Location: Achipur, South 24 Parganas district, West Bengal
- Country: India
- Interactive map of Achipur Chinese Temple

Architecture
- Type: Chinese temple
- Founder: Tong Achew

Achipur Chinese Temple is a historic Chinese temple complex situiated at Achipur, in South 24 Parganas district of the Indian state of West Bengal. It is considered as one of the oldest surviving Chinese religious sites in India.

== History ==
A Chinese tea trader Tong Achew landed in 1778 at Achipur on the banks of Hooghly River, near Budge Budge. The then Governor General Warren Hastings granted land to Achew to set up a sugar cane plantation and sugar factory. Several Chinese workers, migrated to India for employment and Achew founded the Chinese settlement later became known as Achipur. After Tong Achew's death, members of the Chinese community constructed the temple near his burial site. The temple continued to be maintained by descendants of the Chinese community and later by Chinese associations based in Kolkata.

== Gallery ==
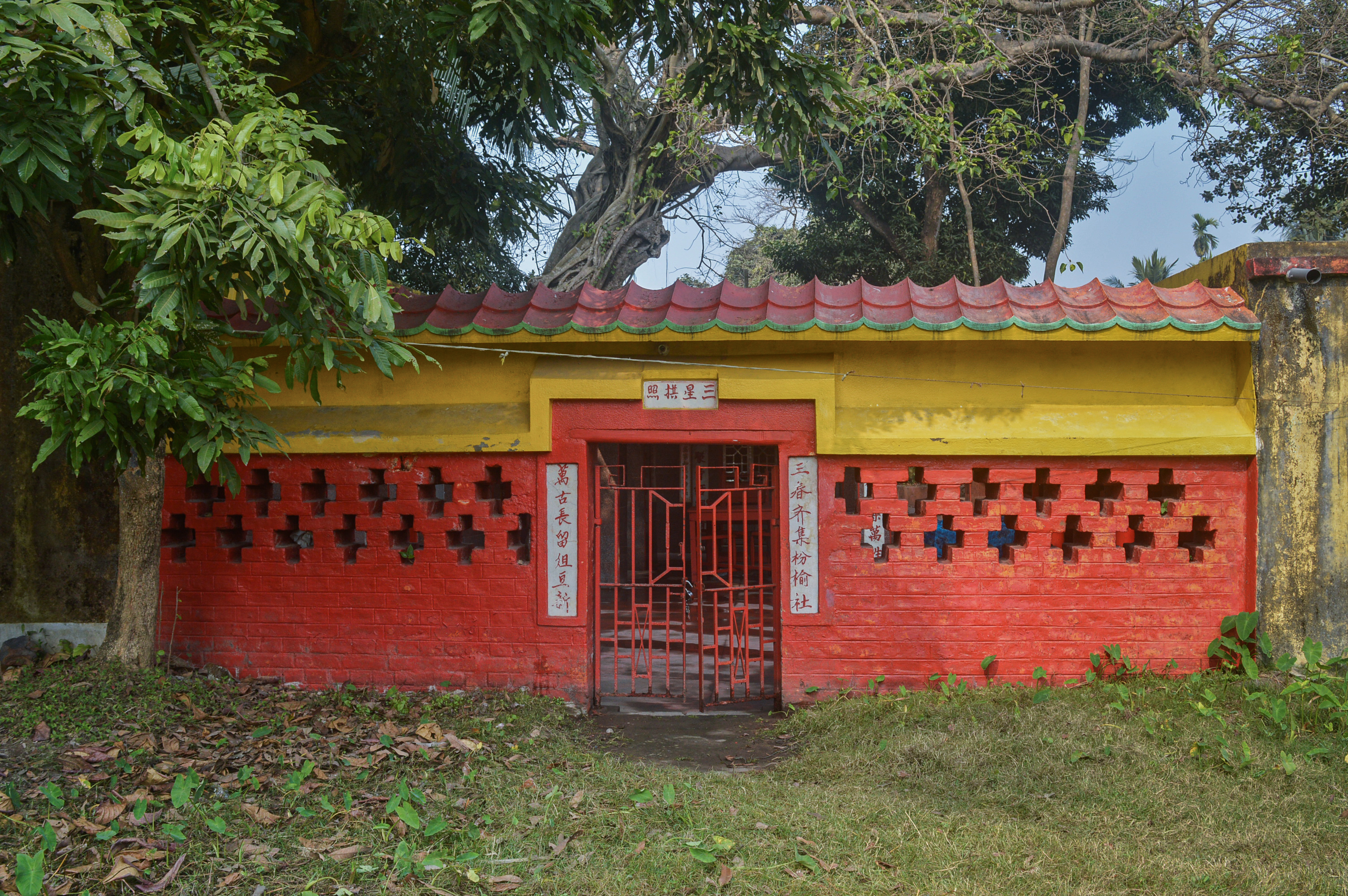

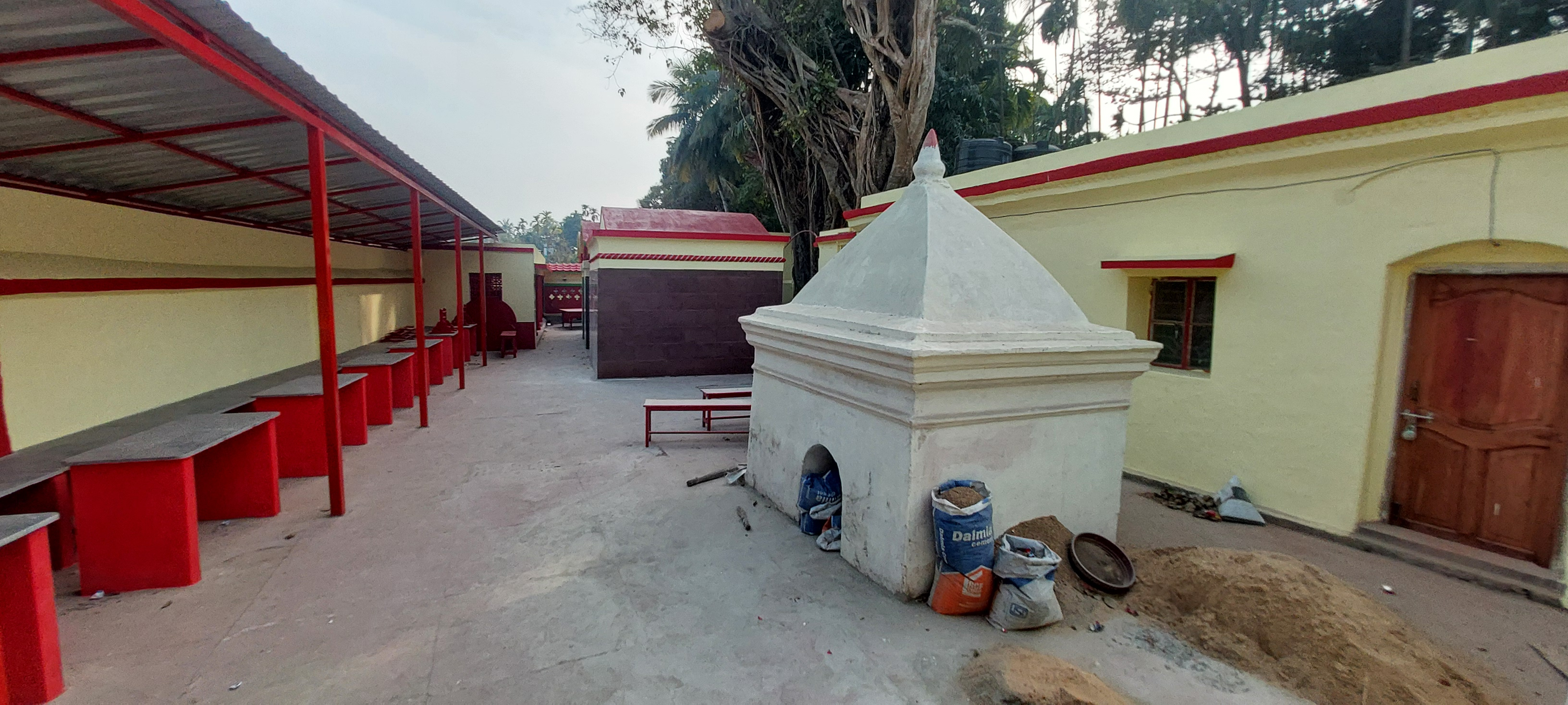

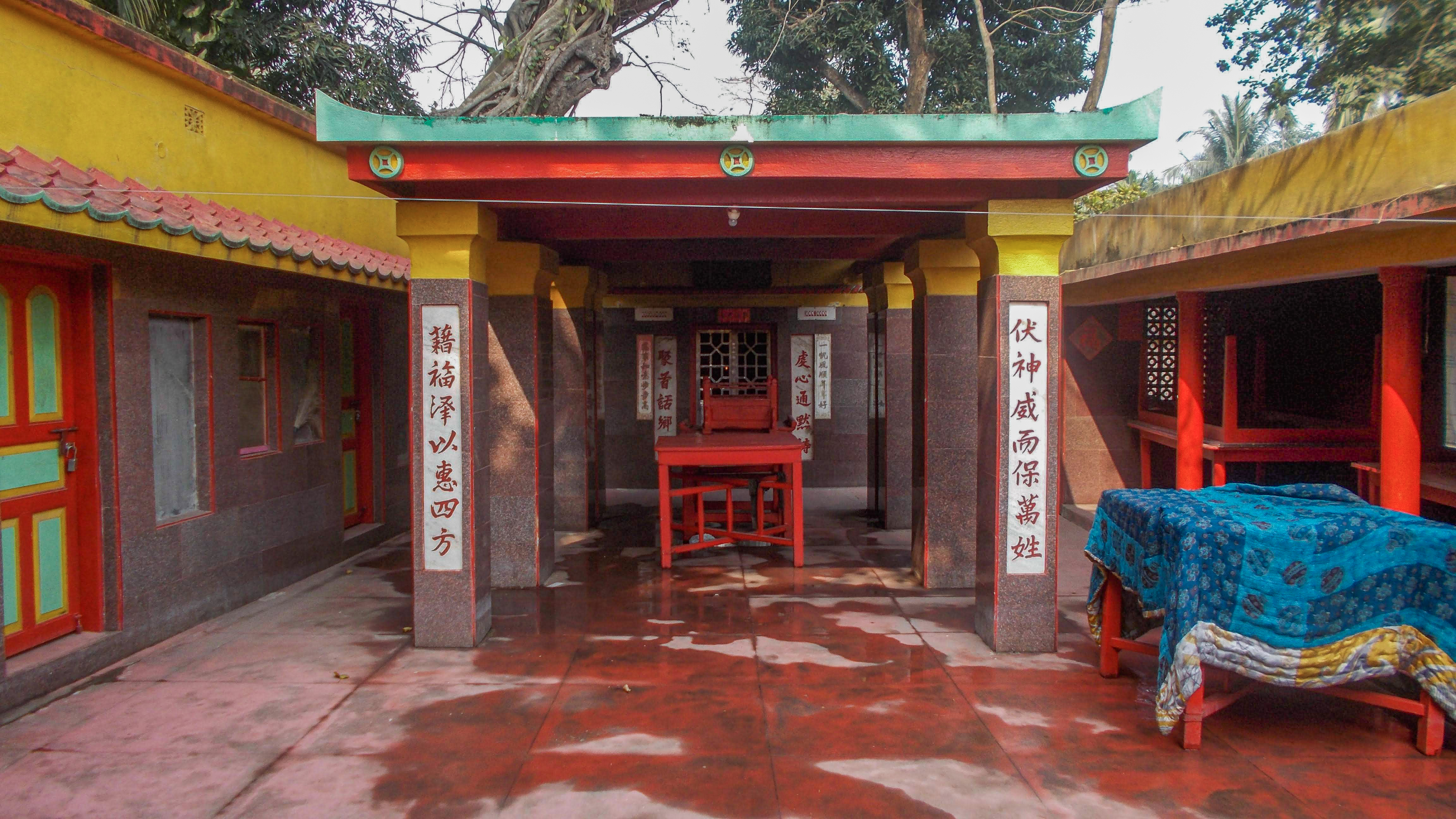

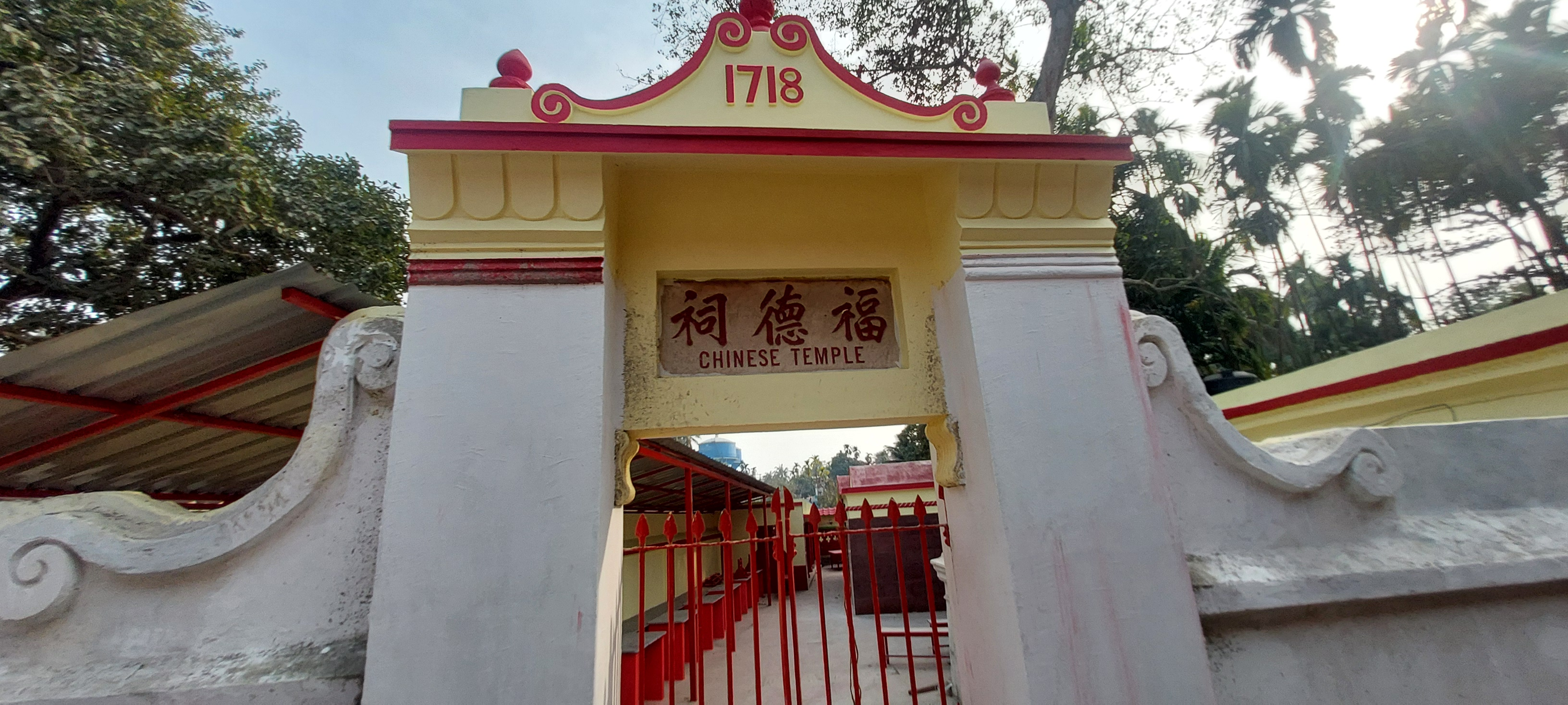

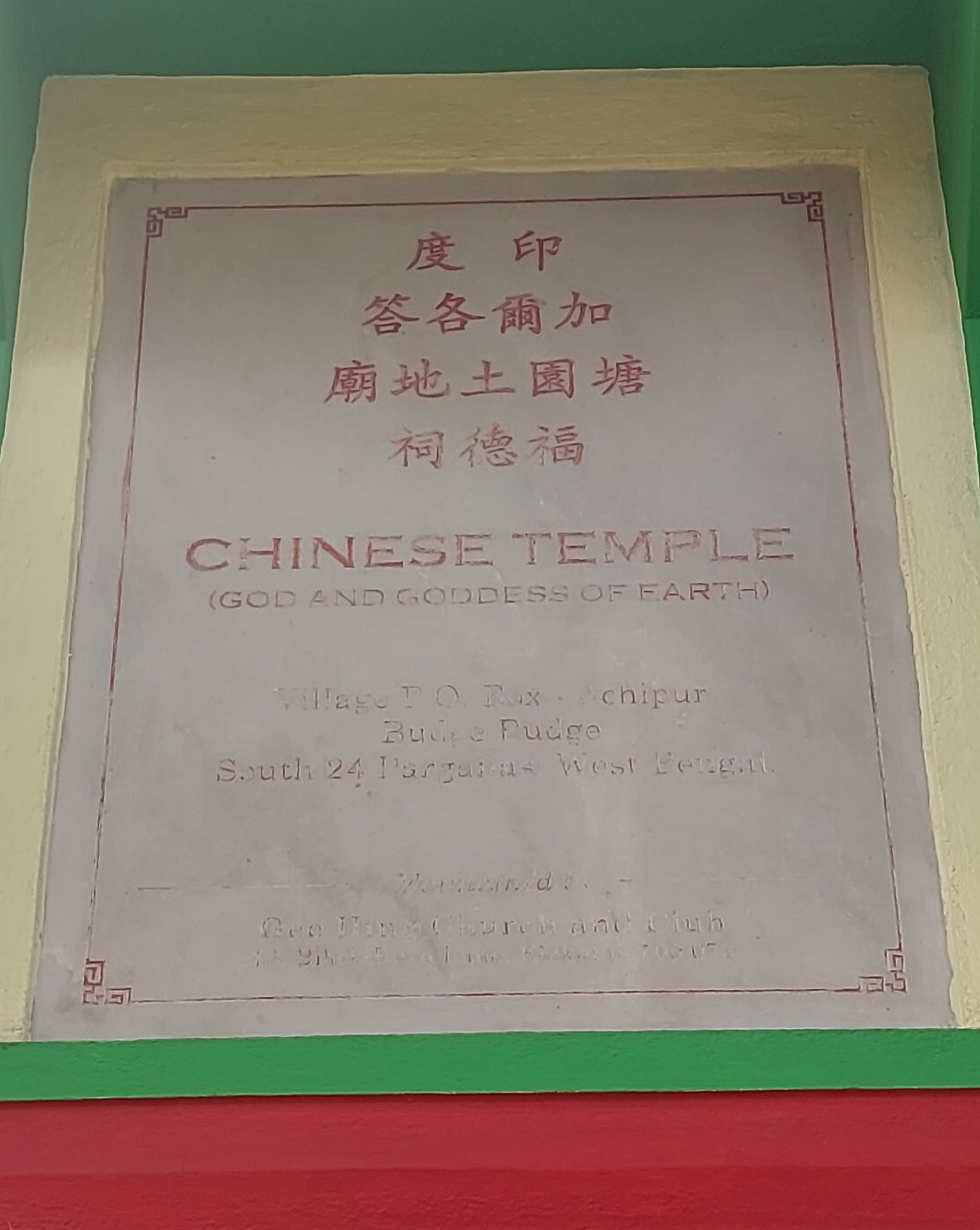

== See also ==
- Chinese people in Kolkata
- Chinese New Year
- Tiretta Bazaar
- Chinese temples in Kolkata
