= Chindians =

People of mixed Chinese and Indian ancestry

People of Chinese and Indian origins
Chindians

Regions with significant populations
- Mainly: Singapore; Malaysia; Also: China (Hong Kong, Macau); India; Thailand; Indonesia; Philippines; South Africa; Fiji; Mauritius; Guyana; Suriname; Jamaica; Trinidad and Tobago; Martinique

Languages
- English; French; Dutch; Tagalog; Indonesian; Thai; Malay; Tamil; Sranan Tongo; Guyanese Creole; Jamaican Patois; Trinidadian Creole; Hindi; Urdu; Telugu; Martinican Creole; Mauritian Creole; Caribbean Hindustani; Fiji Hindi; Mandarin Chinese; Cantonese; Penang Hokkien; Singaporean Hokkien; Other languages of India and other languages of China

Religion
- Hinduism; Christianity (Catholicism, Protestantism); Buddhism; Taoism; Confucianism; Islam

Related ethnic groups
- Indian Singaporeans; Chinese Singaporeans; Indians in Thailand; Thai Chinese; Malaysian Indians; Malaysian Chinese; Indian Indonesians; Chinese Indonesians; Indian Filipinos; Chinese Filipinos; Indians in China; Chinese people in India; Sino-Mauritians

Chindians (Hindi: चीनी-भारतीय; Chinese: 中印人; pinyin: Zhōngyìnrén; Cantonese Yale: Jūngyanyàn; Thai: ชินเดียน; Tamil: சிந்தியன்; Telugu: చిండియన్స్) are an informal term used to refer to a person of mixed ancestry originating from India and China. This includes individuals from the various ethnic groups native to modern-day China and India.

There are a considerable number of Chindians in Malaysia and Singapore due to their shared history as part of British Malaya. People of Chinese and Indian origins had emigrated to Southeast Asia in large numbers during the 19th and 20th centuries, leading to significant cultural interaction and intermarriage. Sizeable populations also reside in Hong Kong, owing to its history as British Hong Kong, and in other nations with large overseas Chinese and Indian diaspora communities, such as Jamaica, Martinique, Trinidad and Tobago, Suriname, and Guyana in the Caribbean, as well as more recently in the United States, Canada, United Kingdom, Australia, New Zealand, and Mauritius.

== Etymology ==
The term "Chindian" is a portmanteau for both "Chinese" and "Indian" people.

== Countries ==
=== China ===
There are around 45,000–48,000 Indian nationals/expatriates living in mainland China as of 2015.

==== Hong Kong ====
25,000 of the Muslims in Hong Kong trace their roots back to what is now Pakistan. Around half of them belong to 'local boy' families, Muslims of mixed Chinese (Tanka) and Indian/Pakistani ancestry, descended from early Indian/Pakistani male immigrants who took local Chinese wives and brought their children up as Muslims and many remained there after the handover from Britain to China in 1997 as part of the SAR. These "local Indians" were not completely accepted by either the Chinese or Indian communities.

=== India ===
There are tiny communities of Chinese who migrated to India during the British Raj and became naturalised citizens of India and there are 189,000 estimated total ethnic Chinese of Chindian or full Chinese ancestry. The community living in Kolkata numbers around 4,000 and 400 families in Mumbai, where there are Chinatowns. Chinese Indians also contributed to the development of fusion Indian Chinese cuisine (Chindian cuisine), which is now an integral part of the Indian culinary scene.

There are an estimated 5,000–7,000 Chinese expatriates living in India as of 2015, having doubled in number in recent years. Most work on 2 to 3 year contracts for the growing number of Chinese brands and companies doing business in India.

==== British India ====
During the British Raj, some Chinese "convicts" deported from the Straits Settlements were sent to be jailed in Madras in India. The "Madras district gazetteers, Volume 1" reported an incident where the Chinese convicts escaped and killed the police sent to apprehend them: "Much of the building work was done by Chinese convicts sent to the Madras jails from the Straits Settlements (where there was no sufficient prison accommodation) and more than once these people escaped from the temporary buildings' in which they were confined at Lovedale. In 186^ seven of them got away and it was several days before they were apprehended by the Tahsildar, aided by Badagas sent out in all directions to search. On 28 July in the following year twelve others broke out during a very stormy night and parties of armed police were sent out to scour the hills for them. They were at last arrested in Malabar a fortnight later. Some police weapons were found in their possession and one of the parties of police had disappeared—an ominous coincidence. Search was made all over the country for the party and at length, on 15 September, their four bodies were found lying in the jungle at Walaghát, half way down the Sispára ghát path, neatly laid out in a row with their severed heads carefully placed on their shoulders. It turned out that the wily Chinamen, on being overtaken, had at first pretended to surrender and had then suddenly attacked the police and killed them with their own weapons." Other Chinese convicts in Madras who were released from jail then settled in the Nilgiri mountains near Naduvattam and married Tamil Paraiyan women, having mixed Chinese-Tamil children with them. They were documented by Edgar Thurston. Paraiyan is also anglicised as "pariah".

Edgar Thurston described the colony of the Chinese men with their Tamil pariah wives and children: "Halting in the course of a recent anthropological expedition on the western side of the Nilgiri plateau, in the midst of the Government Cinchona plantations, I came across a small settlement of Chinese, who have squatted for some years on the slopes of the hills between Naduvatam and Gudalur and developed, as the result of ' marriage ' with Tamil pariah women, into a colony, earning an honest livelihood by growing vegetables, cultivating coffee on a small scale and adding to their income from these sources by the economic products of the cow. An ambassador was sent to this miniature Chinese Court with a suggestion that the men should, in return for monies, present themselves before me with a view to their measurements being recorded. The reply which came back was in its way racially characteristic as between Hindus and Chinese. In the case of the former, permission to make use of their bodies for the purposes of research depends essentially on a pecuniary transaction, on a scale varying from two to eight annas. The Chinese, on the other hand, though poor, sent a courteous message to the effect that they did not require payment in money, but would be perfectly happy if I would give them, as a memento, copies of their photographs." Thurston further describe a specific family: "The father was a typical Chinaman, whose only grievance was that, in the process of conversion to Christianity, he had been obliged to 'cut him tail off.' The mother was a typical Tamil Pariah of dusky hue. The colour of the children was more closely allied to the yellowish tint of the father than to the dark tint of the mother and the semimongol parentage was betrayed in the slant eyes, flat nose and (in one case) conspicuously prominent cheek-bones." Thurston's description of the Chinese-Tamil families were cited by others, one mentioned "an instance mating between a Chinese male with a Tamil Pariah female" A 1959 book described attempts made to find out what happened to the colony of mixed Chinese and Tamils.

According to Alabaster there were lard manufacturers and shoemakers in addition to carpenters. Running tanneries and working with leather was traditionally not considered a respectable profession among caste Hindus and work was relegated to lower caste muchis and chamars. There was a high demand, however, for high quality leather goods in colonial India, one that the Chinese were able to fulfill. Alabaster also mentions licensed opium dens run by native Chinese and a Cheena Bazaar where contraband was readily available. Opium, however, was not illegal until after India's Independence from Great Britain in 1947. Immigration continued unabated through the turn of the century and during World War I partly due to political upheavals in China such as the First and Second Opium Wars, First Sino-Japanese War and the Boxer Rebellion. Around the time of the First World War, the first Chinese-owned tanneries sprang up.

In Assam, local Assamese women married Chinese migrants during British colonial times. It later became hard to physically differentiate Chinese in Assam from locals during the time of their internment during the 1962 war, as the majority of these Chinese in Assam were mixed.

=== Singapore ===
The government of Singapore classifies individuals based on their father's ethnicity. Hence, a Chindian with an Indian father is recorded simply as "Indian" in censuses and demographics, while one with a Chinese father is recorded as "Chinese." Singapore only began allowing mixed-race persons to register two racial classifications (e.g. Indian–Chinese) on their identity cards in 2010. Parents may choose the order in which these races are listed, with the first being considered the individual's "main" race. Regardless of the complexity of a person's ancestry, no more than two races may be officially listed. According to Singapore's 2017 marriage statistics, Indian grooms marrying Chinese brides accounted for 5% of all inter-ethnic marriages.

=== Malaysia ===
In Malaysia, the offspring of such marriages are also informally known as "Chindians." However, the Malaysian government follows a similar protocol to Singapore, generally classifying individuals according to their father's ethnicity. As the majority of these intermarriages involve an Indian male and a Chinese female, most Chindians in Malaysia are officially categorised simply as Indians by the state in censuses and demographics.

=== Guyana ===
In Guyana, Chinese men married Indian women due to the lack of Chinese women in the early days of settlement. Creole relationships and unions between Chinese and Indians were rare in the beginning, though it became less so later on as some Chinese men established relationships and intermarried with Indian women due to the scarcity of Chinese women. There were selective instances where Chinese men took their Indian wives back with them to China. Indian women and children were brought alongside Indian men as coolies while Chinese men made up 99% of Chinese coolies.

There are few accounts of unions and marriages between the Chinese and the Indians in Guyana. An account of the era told by women in British Guiana is of a single Chinese man who was allowed to temporarily borrow a Hindu Indian woman by her Indian husband who was his friend, so the Chinese man could sire a child with her, after a son was born to her the Chinese man kept the boy while she was returned to her Indian husband, the boy was named William Adrian Lee. An Indian woman named Mary See married a Chinese man surnamed Wu in Goedverwagting and founded their own family after he learned how to process sugar cane.

The contrast with the female to male ratio among Indian and Chinese immigrants has been compared by historians.

In Guyana, while marriages between Indian women and black African men is socially shameful to Indians, Chinese-Indian marriages are considered acceptable as reported by Joseph Nevadomsky in 1983. "Chiney-dougla" is the Indian Guyanese term for mixed Chinese-Indian children. Some Indian women in Guyana practiced polyandry within their community due to the extreme shortage of women compared to men.

In British Guiana, the Chinese did not maintain their distinctive physical features due to the high rate of Chinese men marrying people other ethnicities like Indian women. The severe imbalance with Indian men outnumbering Indian women led some women to take advantage of the situation to squeeze favors from men and leave their partners for other men, one infamous example was a pretty, light skinned, Christian Indian woman named Mary Ilandun with ancestral origins from Madras, born in 1846, who had relations with Indian, black, and Chinese men as she married them in succession and ran off with their money to her next paramour, doing this from 1868 to 1884. Indian men used force to bring Indian women back in line from this kind of behavior, such as infamous "wife murders". The most severe lack of women in all the peoples of British Guiana was with the Chinese and this led Europeans to believe that Chinese did not engage in wife murders while wife murders was something innate to Indian men. Chinese women were viewed as more chaste than their Indian counterparts. Chinese women were not indentured and since they did not need to work, they avoided prospective men seeking relationships, while the character of Indian women was disparaged as immoral and their alleged sexual immorality was blamed for their deaths in the "wife murders" by Indian men. The sex ratio of Indian men to Indian women was 100:63 while the sex ratio of Chinese men to Chinese women was 100:43 in British Guiana in 1891.

In British Guiana there was growth of coolie Indian women marriages with Chinese men and it was reported that "It is not an uncommon thing to find a cooly woman living with a Chinaman as his wife, and in one or two instances the woman has accompanied her reputed husband to China." by Dr. Comins in 1891 and an 1892 Immigration British Guiana authorities took note of marriages between Indian women and Chinese men that year.

=== Jamaica ===
When black and Indian women had children with Chinese men the children were called chaina raial in Jamaican English. The Chinese community in Jamaica was able to consolidate because an openness to marrying Indian women was present in the Chinese since Chinese women were in short supply. Polyandry was rare among the Indian population in Jamaica according to Verene A. Shepherd. The small number of Indian women were fought over between Indian men and led to a rise in the number of wife murders by Indian men. Indian women made up 11 percent of the annual number of Indian indentured migrants from 1845 to 1847 in Jamaica.

=== Mauritius ===
In the late 19th to early 20th century, Chinese men in Mauritius married Indian women due to both a lack of Chinese women and higher numbers of Indian women on the island. During the early days of migration the prospect of relations with Indian women was unappealing to the male dominated Chinese coolies. Though they eventually had to establish civil unions and marriages with Indian women due to. the lack of Chinese women in Mauritius. The 1921 census in Mauritius counted that Indian women there had a total of 148 children sired by Chinese men. While the majority of the Chinese migrants to Mauritius were coolies, who engaged in labour-intensive roles, some of them were traders. Colonialist stereotypes in the sugar colonies of Indians emerged such as the "coolie wife beater" and "degraded coolie woan", due to instances of Indian women being murdered by their husbands after they ran away to other richer men since the ratio of Indian women to men was low. Both the Chinese and Indian communities were largely endogamous. Intermarriage between people of different Chinese and Indian language groups is rare; it is so rare that the cases of intermarriage between Cantonese and Hakka can be individually named. Hakka Chinese, who came after Cantonese and Fujian Chinese, were less likely to marry Indians.

=== Thailand ===
Long before the rise of Bangkok, the mainland Southeast Asia was anchored by the Khmer Empire, which acted as a pipeline for Indianized culture by the rich identity of modern Thailand is built on an incredible cultural fusion where Chinese and Indian elements. While the term "Chindian" typically describes individuals of mixed Indian and Chinese descent, in the context of Thailand, this fusion is less about a distinct minority group and more about how Indian spiritual, administrative, and linguistic frameworks merged with Chinese migration, trade, and economic influence to create the modern Thai people.

=== Trinidad ===
Trinidanian Prime Minister Stuart Young was born on Henry Street, Port of Spain, on 9 February 1975 to a Catholic Chinese father, Richard Peter Young, (Chinese Trinidadian), and an Indian Muslim mother, Priscilla Hosein, (Indo-Trinidadian). He was raised Catholic but his mother is Muslim and grew up on Lal Beharry Trace in Debe.

The situation in Trinidad and British Guiana with Indian women being fewer than Indian men led to Indian women using the situation to their advantage by leaving their partners for other men, leading to a high incidence of "wife murders" by Indian men on their wives, and Indian women and culture were branded as "immoral" by European observers, an Indian Muslim man named Mohammad Orfy petitioned as a representative of "destitute Indian men of Trinidad", to the colonial authorities, complaining of Indian women's behavior and claiming that it was "a perforating plague...the high percentage of immoral lives led by the female section of our community...to satisfy the greed and lust of the male section of quite a different race to theirs...[Indian women] are enticed, seduced and frightened into becoming concubines, and paramours...[Indian women] have absolutely no knowledge whatsoever of the value of being in virginhood...most shameless and a perfect menace to the Indian gentry." with him naming specific peoples, claiming that Indian women were having relationships with men of various races, including Chinese, Africans, Americans, and Europeans. Saying "Africans, Americans and Chinese in goodly numbers are enticing the females of India, who are more or less subtle to lustful traps augured through some fear of punishment being meted out if not readily submissive as requested."

The situation on Trinidad enabled unprecedented autonomy in the sexual activities of Hindu and Muslim Indian women and freedom. The 1916 "Peition of Indentured Labourers in Trinidad" complained that: "Is it permissible for a male member of the Christian faith to keep a Hindoo or Muslim female as his paramour or concubine? Is this not an act of sacrilege and a disgraceful scandal according to the Christian faith to entice and encourage Indian females to lead immoral lives?"

There were instances where plantations managers and overseers had intimate relations with indentured woman. According to Attorney General W.F. Haynes Smith, Indian indentured women in marital or civil unions with men of different races, English, Portuguese, and Chinese. Unions between Indian men and Creole women were rare, as the Indian men viewed creole women negatively. Approval of interracial marriage has increased in Trinidad and Tobago and one Chinese man reported that his Indian wife did not encounter any rejection from his parents when asked in a survey. In Trinidad Europeans and Chinese are seen as acceptable marriage partners for Indian women by Indian families while marrying black men would lead to rejection of their daughters by Indian families.

=== Martinique ===
As a result, some plantation owners imported workers from India and China after the abolishment of slavery in 1848 by the French national convention, with Chindians becoming citizens of France.

== Notable people ==
- Jomo Kwame Sundaram, Malaysian economist and former UNDESA Assistant Secretary-General
- Peter Rajah, Malaysian retired footballer
- Jacintha Abisheganaden, Singaporean actress
- Ronald Arculli, chairman of Hong Kong Exchanges and Clearing and Non-official Members Convenor of the Executive Council of Hong Kong (Exco).
- Vivian Balakrishnan, Singaporean politician
- Indranee Rajah, Singaporean politician
- Darryl David, Singaporean politician and former media personality
- Meiyang Chang, actor, singer, TV host in India
- Bernard Chandran, Malaysian fashion designer
- Anya Ayoung-Chee, winner of Miss Trinidad and Tobago Universe 2008 and contestant in the Miss Universe 2008 pageant
- Chen Gexin, Chinese songwriter
- Che'Nelle (Cheryline Lim), Malaysian-born recording artist signed to Virgin Records America
- Karen David, British singer-songwriter born in Meghalaya, India
- Vanessa Fernandez, Singaporean singer and radio presenter
- Jonathan Foo, Guyanese cricketer
- Hedy Fry, Trinidadian-Canadian politician
- Jonathan Putra, Malaysian TV personality
- Jwala Gutta, Indian badminton player
- Sahil Khan, Indian actor
- Law Lan, Hong Kong actress
- Mak Pak Shee, Singaporean politician
- Nicole Narain, American model
- Francissca Peter, Malaysian singer
- Joseph Prince, Singaporean pastor and evangelist
- Michelle Saram, Hong Kong actress born in Singapore
- Nicol David, Malaysian athlete and former world number one female squash player
- Astra Sharma, Australian tennis player
- Priscilla Shunmugam, Singaporean fashion designer
- Dipna Lim Prasad, Singaporean sprinter and hurdler
- Gurmit Singh, Singaporean television personality
- Prema Yin, Malaysian singer
- Nadine Ann Thomas, Miss Universe Malaysia 2010, actress, model and DJ.
- Vanessa Tevi Kumares, Miss Universe Malaysia 2015
- Joshua Simon, Singaporean radio and media personality, YouTube star
- Liew Kit Kong, former Malaysian national capped footballer
- Ramesh Lai Ban Huat, Malaysian professional footballer
- Kimmy Jayanti, Indonesian model and actress
- Mavin Khoo, Bharata Natyam dancer
- Bilahari Kausikan, Singaporean diplomat
- Keith Foo, Malaysian model and actor
- Aron Winter, Dutch footballer
- Stuart Young, Trinidadian politician and former Prime Minister
- Ruben Gnanalingam, Malaysian businessman and CEO of Wesport Holdings
- Chalida Vijitvongthong, Thai actress
- Varina Tjon-A-Ten, Surinamese politician

== See also ==
- Chindia
- Chinas
- Chinese people in India
- Indians in China
- China–India relations
- Indian Chinese cuisine
