= Chinese temples in Kolkata =

Temples in the Indian city of Kolkata

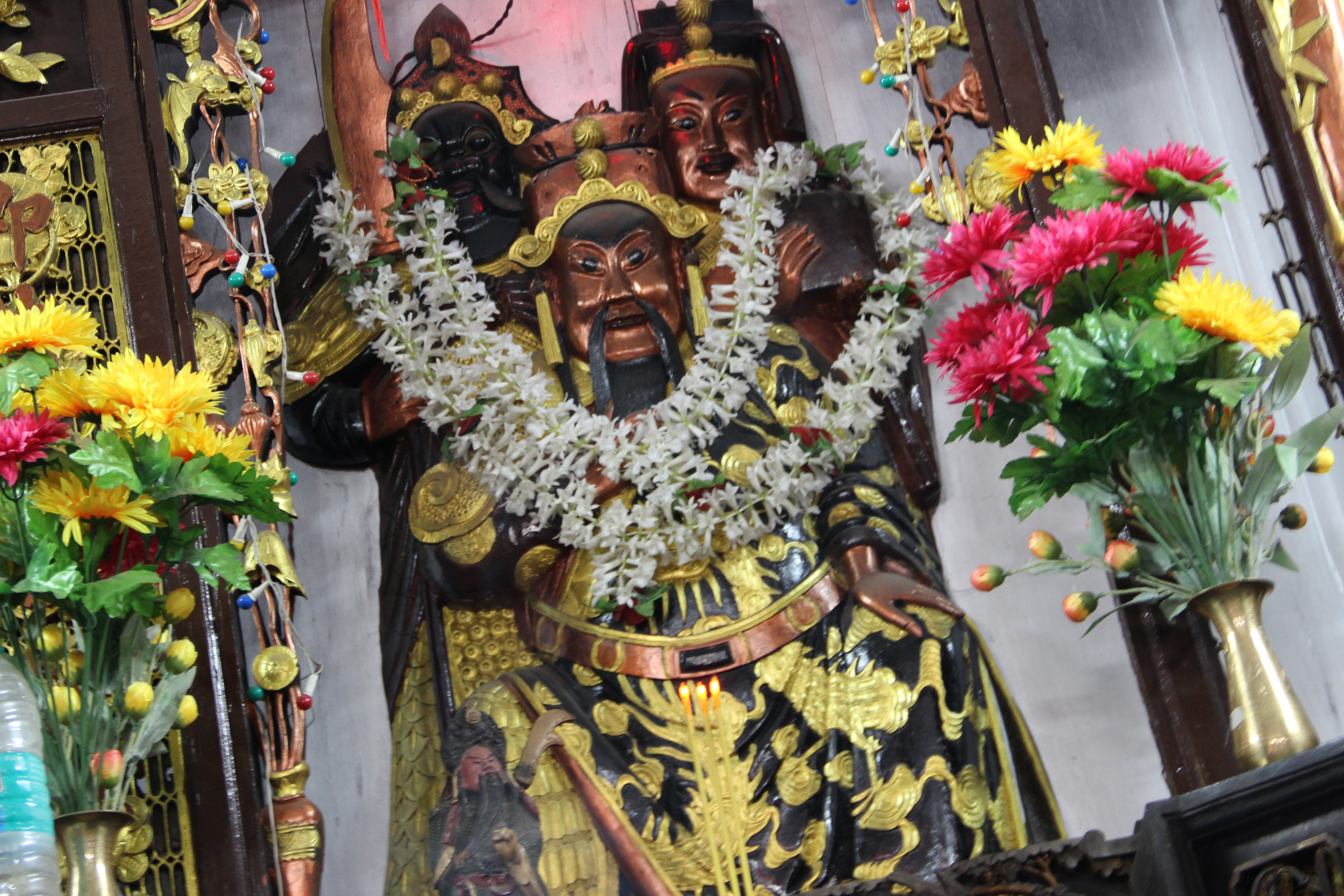
The divinity Guan Di enshrined in the Toong On Church of Kolkata.

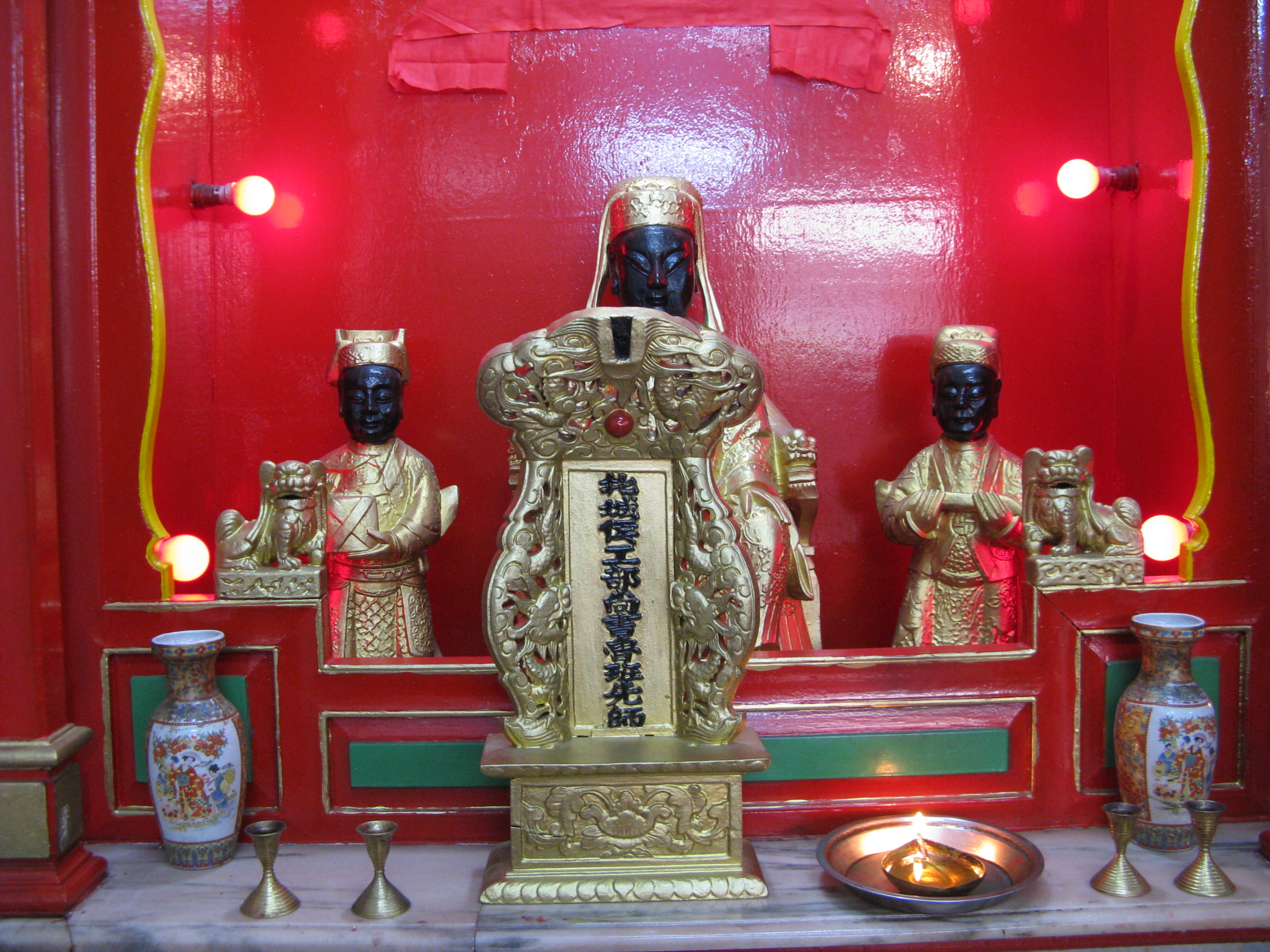
Tablet dedicated to Lu Pan and deities enshrined in the Nam Soon Church of Kolkata.

In Kolkata, Chinese temples are associations (會館) and sites of worship of Chinese folk religion and Chinese Buddhism for the Chinese community in the region. Kolkata has a significant population of Indian nationals of Chinese ethnic origin (immigrants and their descendants that emigrated from China starting in the late 18th century to work at the Kolkata port as well as the Chennai port). Unofficial estimates puts the population anywhere from 5,000 to 200,000, most of whom live in or near Tangra. The Chinese brought with them their culture. At least eight of the Chinese temples are located in the old Chinatown around Tiretta Bazar in Central Kolkata.

== Temples ==
Though the places of worship are referred to as "churches", they are sites of veneration that adhere to Chinese traditional religion and have nothing to do with Christianity.

- Sea Ip Church (四邑會館)
- Toong On Church (東安會館)
- Choonghee Dong Thien Haue Church
- Gee Hing Church
- Sea Voi Yune Leong Futh Church (會寧會館)
- Nam Soon Church (南順會館)
- Hsuan Tsang Monastery

== Gallery ==
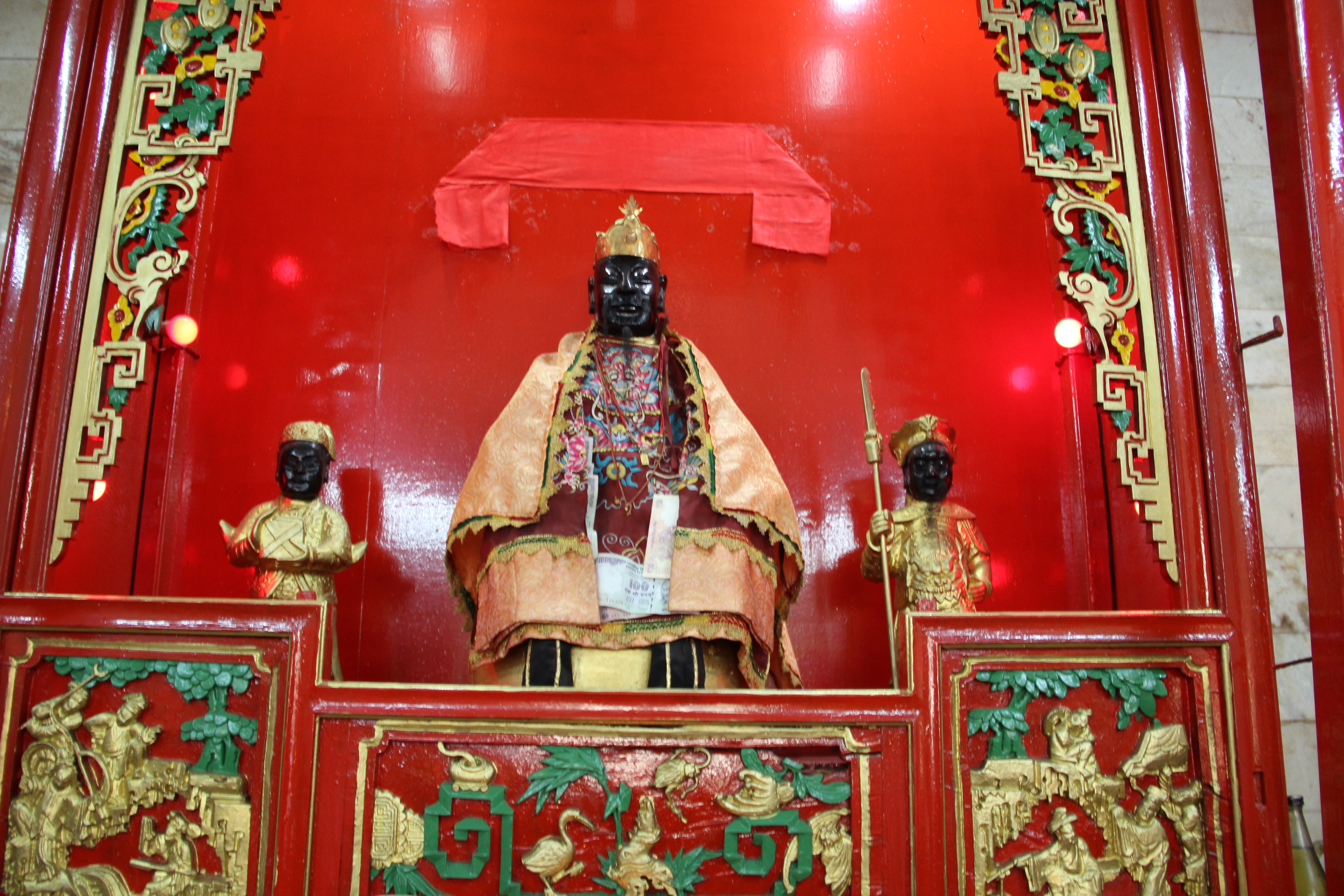
A shrine to Guan Di, flanked by Guan Ping and Zhou Cang.

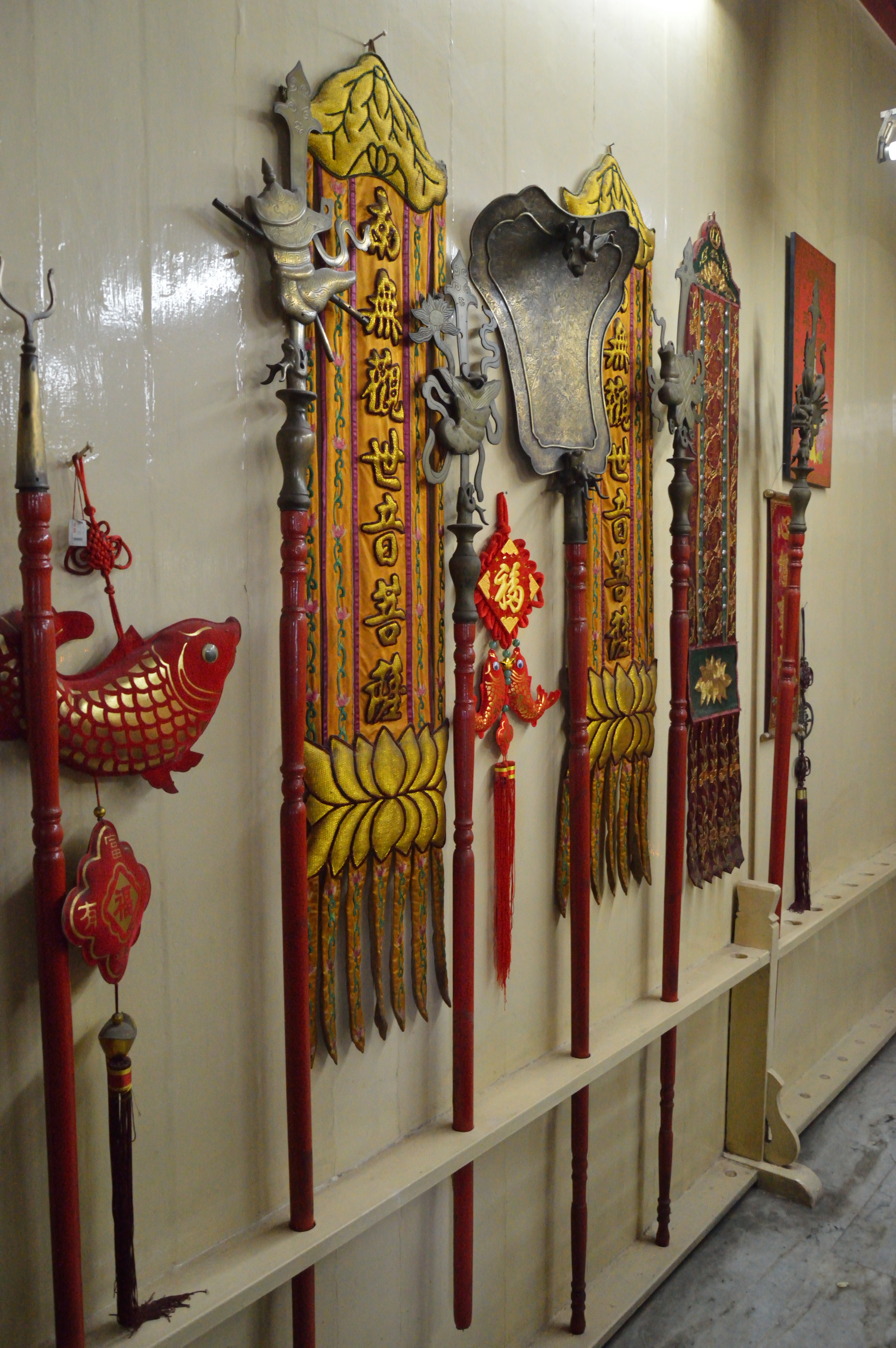
Religious weaponry and scrolls of the Sea Ip Church

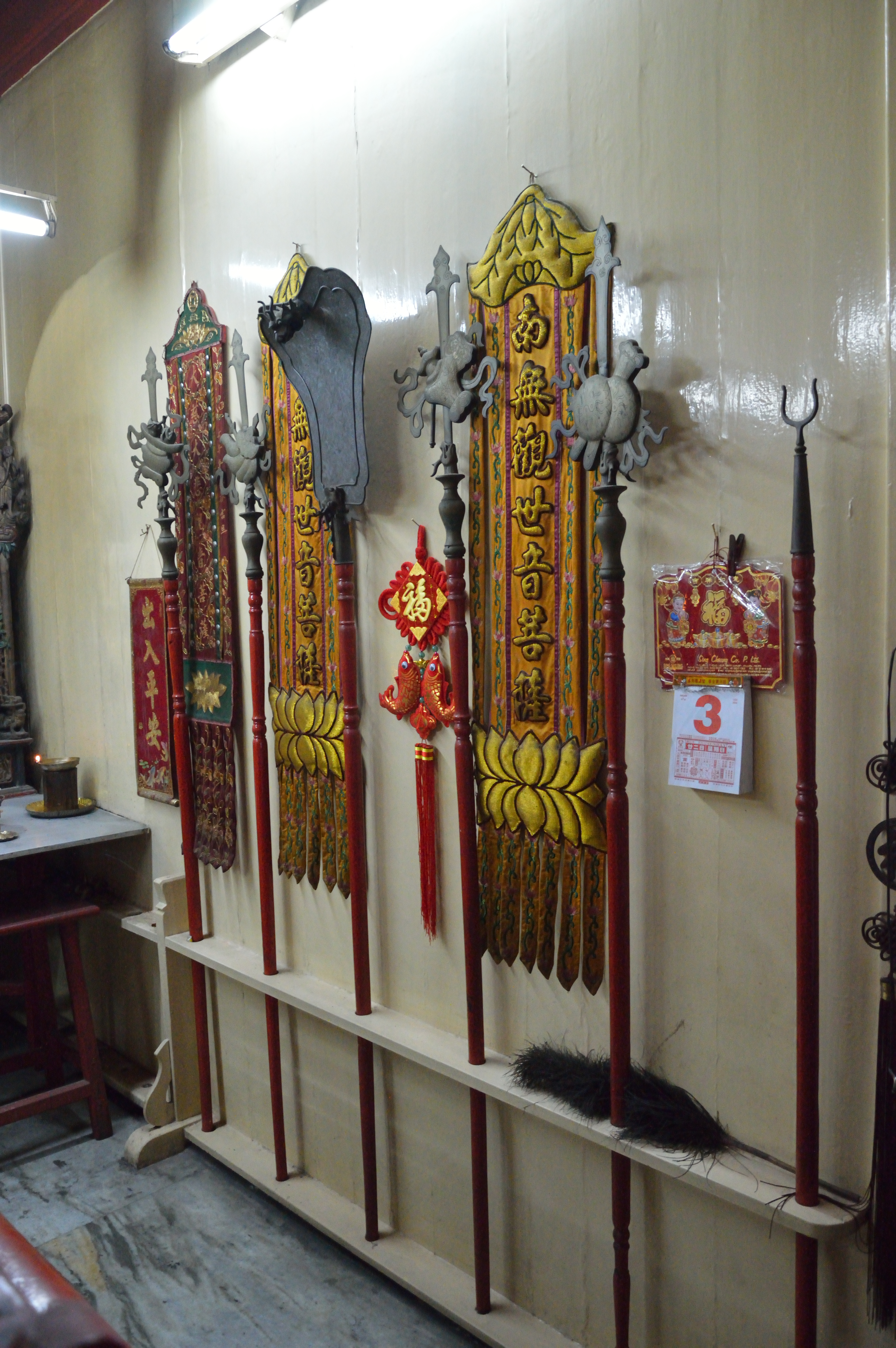
Religious weaponry and scrolls of the Sea Ip Church

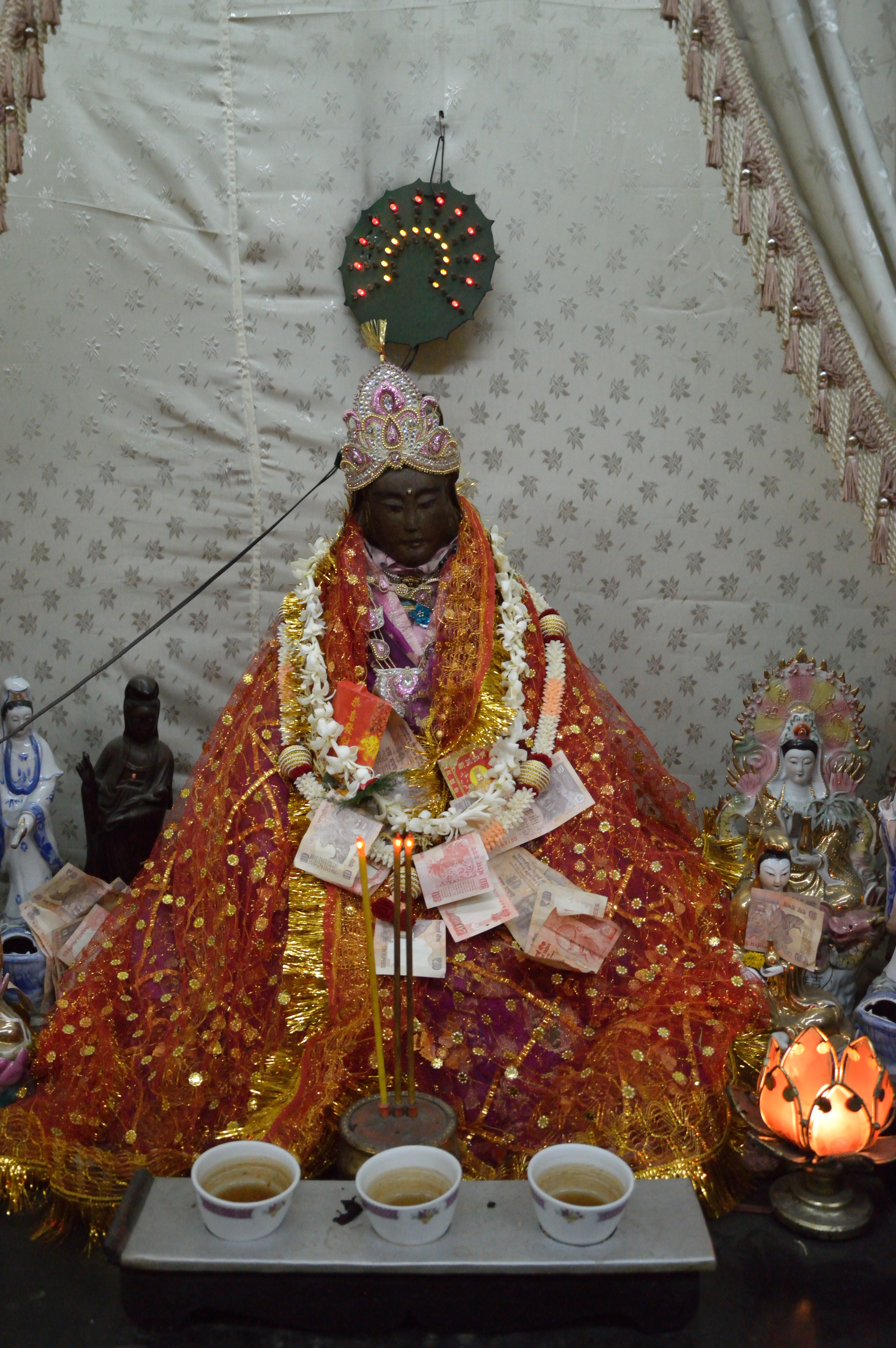
Kuan Shih Yin enshrined in the Sea Ip Church

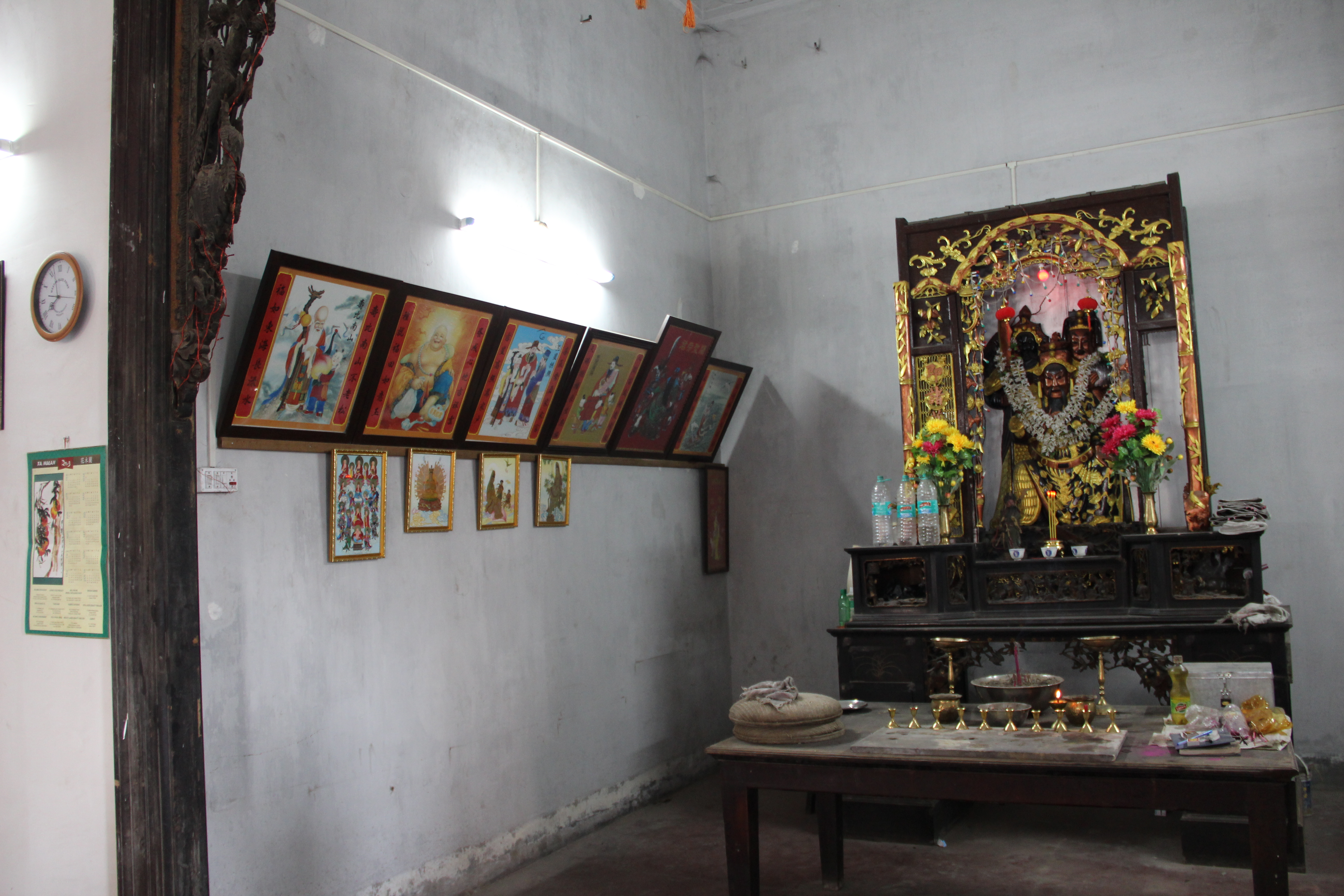
Internal hall of the Toong On Church

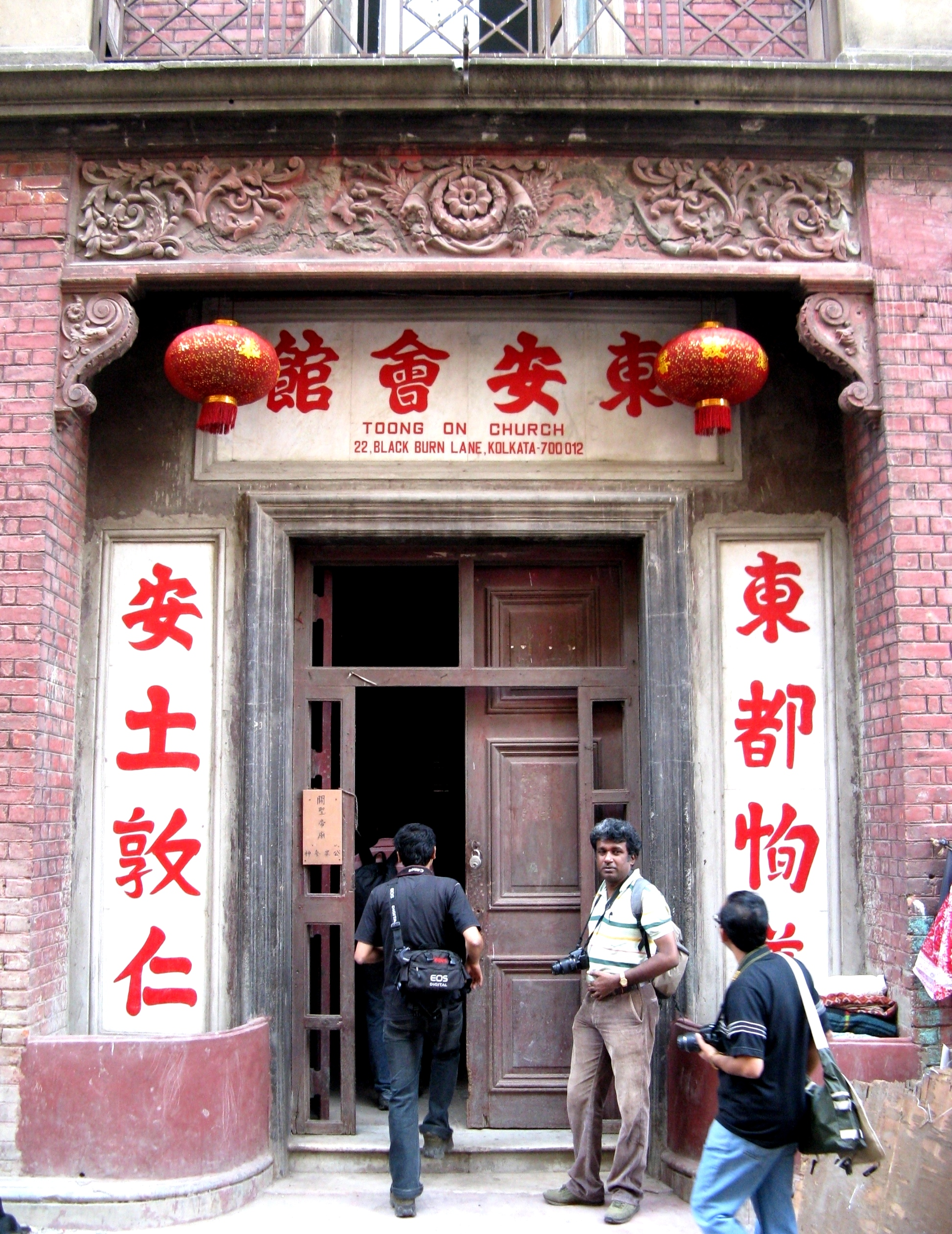
Entrance to the Toong On Church

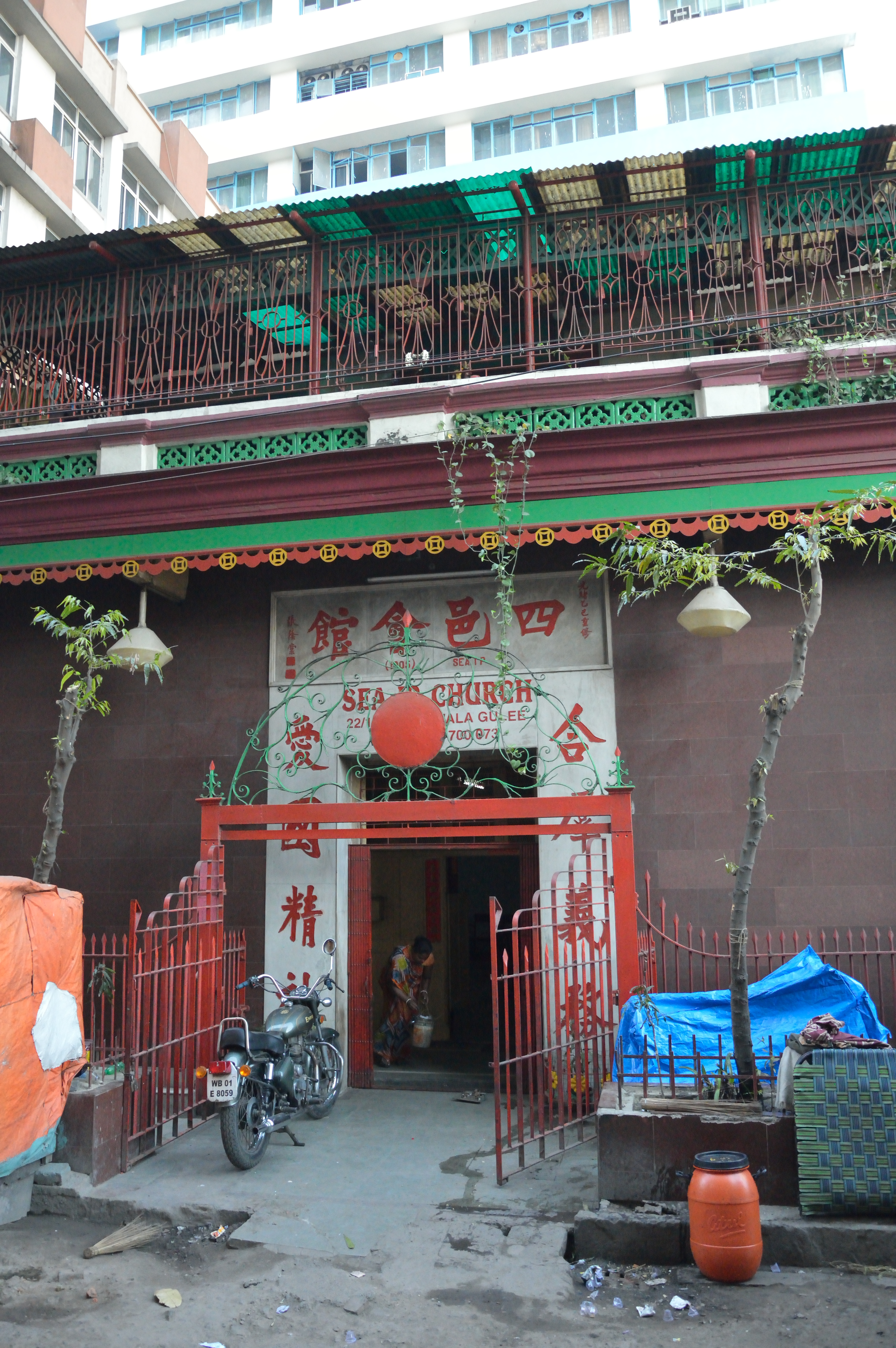
Entrance to the Sea Ip Church

== See also ==
- Chinese folk religion
- Choong Ye Thong Cemetery
- Chinese folk religion in Southeast Asia
- Achipur Chinese Temple
- List of Mazu temples
- Tin Hau temples in Hong Kong
- Kwan Tai temples in Hong Kong
- Hip Tin temples in Hong Kong
- List of City God Temples in China
