= Chinese people in India =

People of Chinese origin settled in India

Chinese people in India Sino-Indians
印度華人/印度华人

Total population
- 2,000 Chinese people in Kolkata (2013) 5,000–7,000 Chinese expatriates (2015)

Regions with significant populations
- Chinese communities: Assam, Kolkata, Mumbai; Chinese expatriates: Mumbai, Gurgaon, Bangalore

Languages
- English, Assamese, Southwestern Mandarin, Cantonese, Hakka Chinese, Hindi

Religion
- Buddhism and Taoism, small minority of Hinduism.

Related ethnic groups
- Chinese people

Chinese people in India are communities of Han Chinese origin and settlement. There are permanent communities descended from immigrants and refugees from China as well as an expatriate community in India on a temporary basis.

The immigrant community of workers started during British Colonial rule and became more prominent in the late 19th century with a small number of arrivals working at the ports in Calcutta and Madras and has gone on to contribute to the social and economic life of Kolkata through manufacturing and trade of leather products and running Chinese restaurants.

The community living in Kolkata numbered around 2,000 in 2013 In Mumbai, the population of Chinese people, many who have multi-generation roots, is around 4,000.

Separate from the multi-generation Chinese communities, there are an estimated 5,000–7,000 Chinese expatriates working in India as of 2015, who generally work on two to three-year contracts for the growing number of brands and companies doing business in India.

== History ==
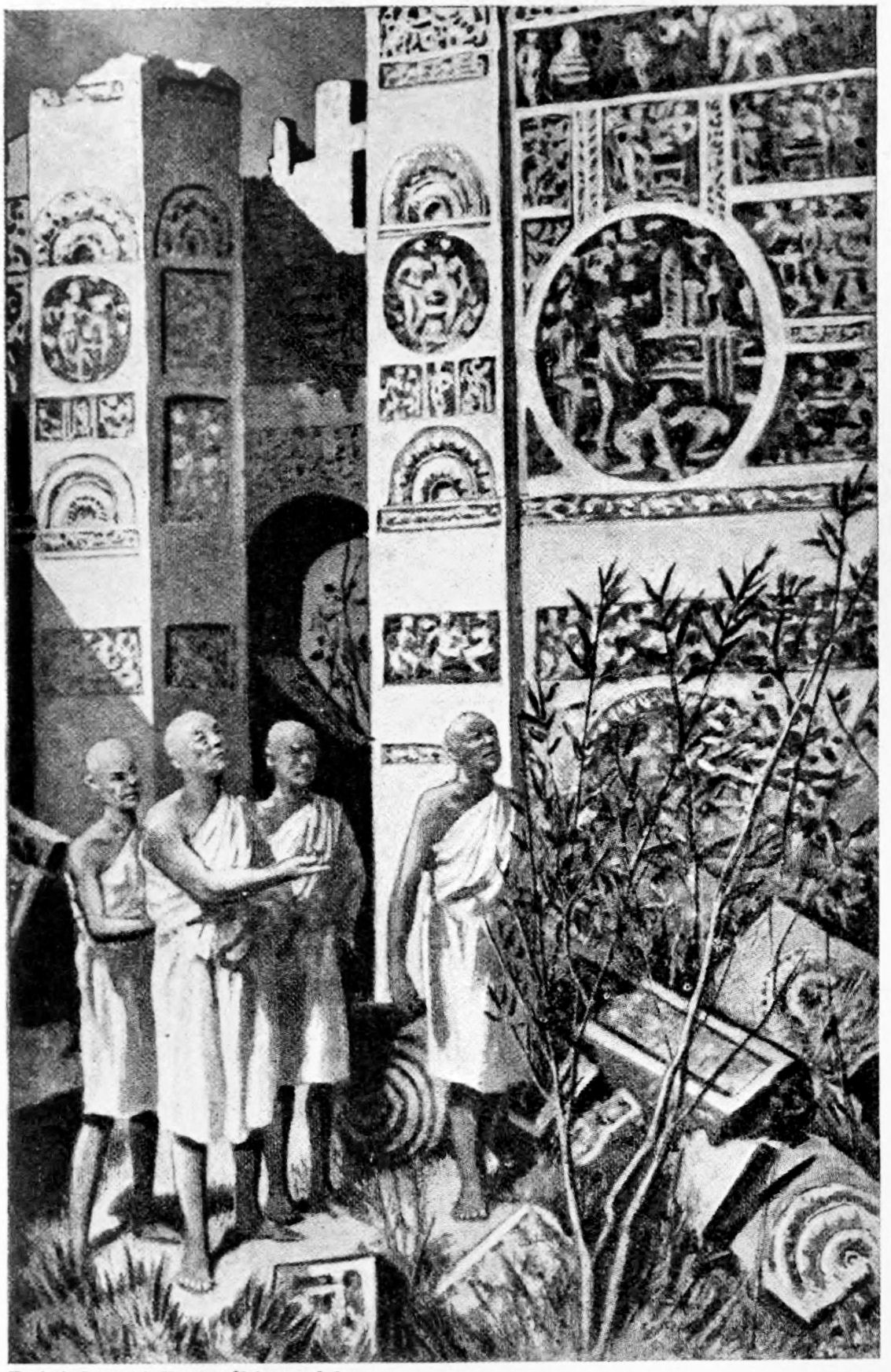
Chinese Buddhist monk Faxian at the ruins of Ashoka palace

The first record of travel from China is Faxian, a monk who temporarily visited Tampralipta, in what is now Tamluk in the 5th century AD. Because of influences from other languages, many words in Bengali language can be attributed to Chinese influences. For example, chini, the Bengali word for "sugar" comes from the word for China, and words like Chinamati for porcelain china hint at Chinese influences.

=== Portuguese India ===
In Portuguese India, the Indian Muslim Kunjali Marakkars fought against the Portuguese and raided their shipping. One of the Kunjali Marrakars (Kunjali IV) rescued a Chinese boy, called Chinali, who had been enslaved on a Portuguese ship. The Kunjali was very fond of him, and he became one of his most feared lieutenants, a fanatical Muslim and enemy of the Portuguese, terrorizing them in battle. The Portuguese were terrorised by the Kunjali and his Chinese right-hand man, eventually, after the Portuguese allied with Calicut's Samorin, under Andre Furtado de Mendoça they attacked the Kunjali and Chinali's forces, and they were handed over to the Portuguese by the Samorin after he reneged on a promise to let them go. Diogo do Couto, a Portuguese historian, questioned the Kunjali and Chinali when they were captured. He was present when the Kunjali surrendered to the Portuguese, and was described: "One of these was Chinale, a Chinese, who had been a servant at Malacca and said to have been the captive of a Portuguese, taken as a boy from a fusta, and afterwards brought to Kunhali, who conceived such an affection for him that he trusted him with everything. He was the greatest exponent of the Moorish superstition and enemy of the Christians in all Malabar and for those taken captive at sea and brought thither he invented the most exquisite kinds of torture when he martyred them."

=== British India ===
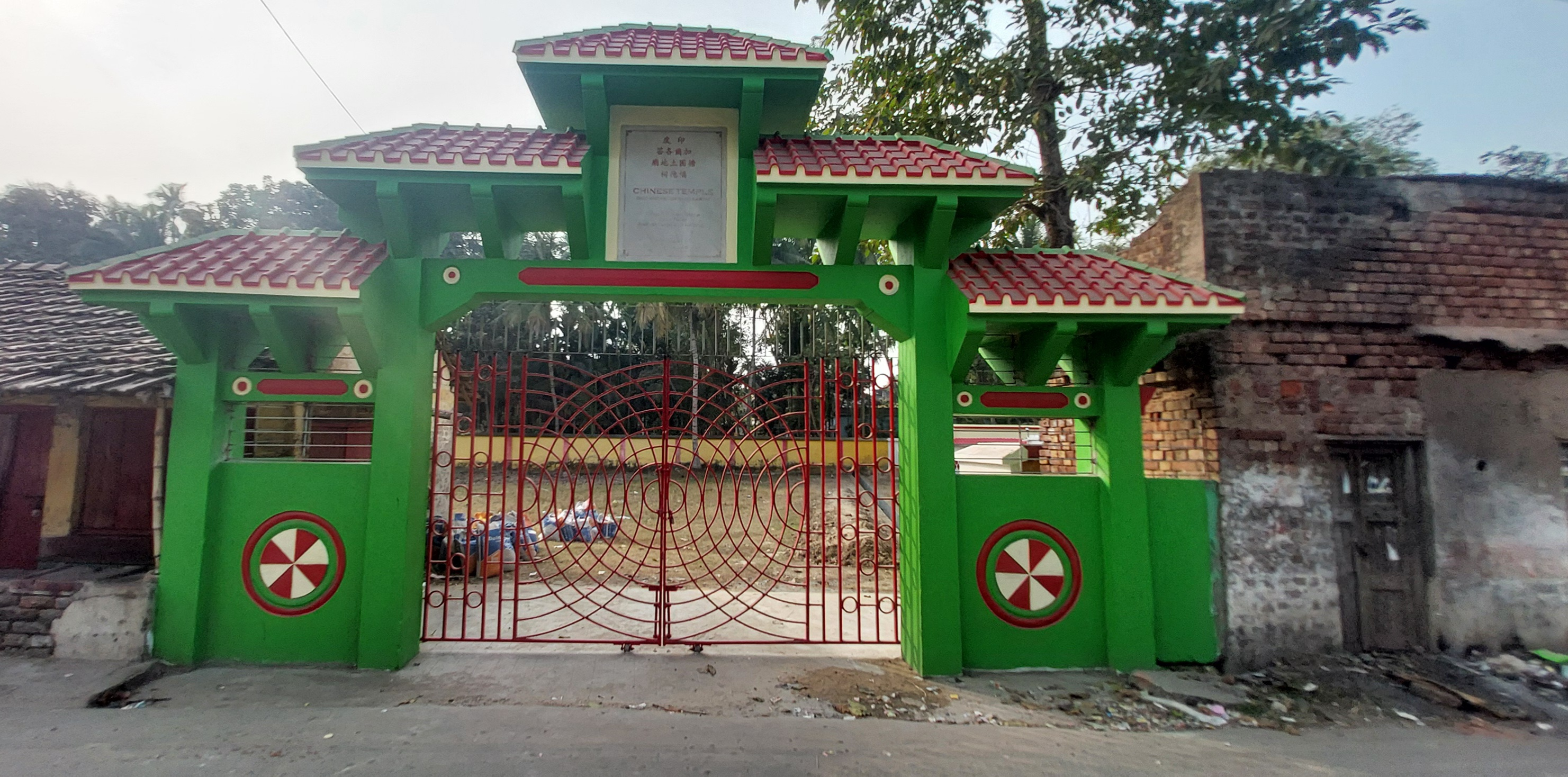
The Chinese temple at Achhipur, the first official Chinese settlement in India

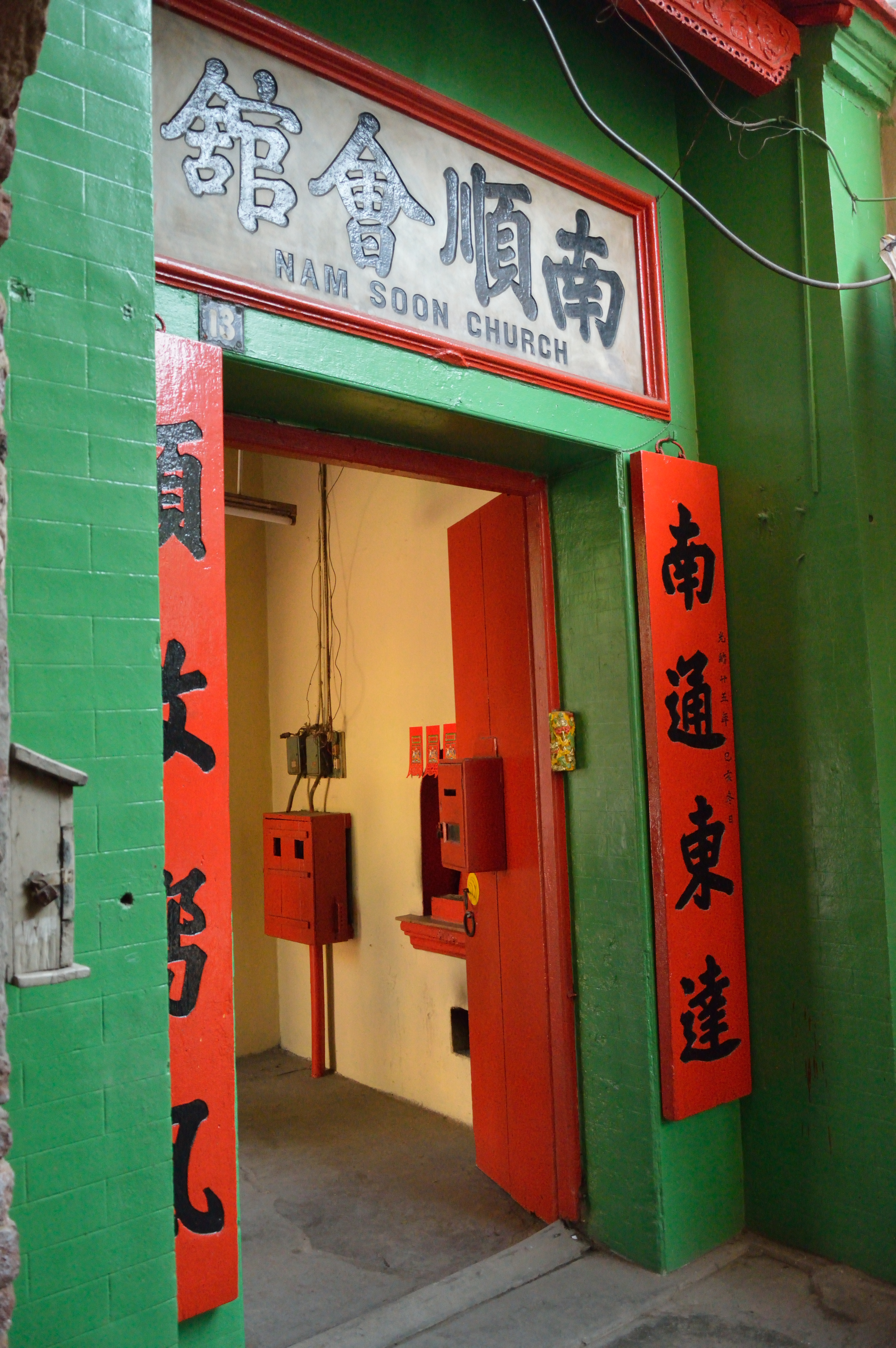
Entrance of Nam Soon Church 南顺会馆, Kolkata

Kolkata, then known as Calcutta, was the capital of British India from 1772 to 1911. Although it was also geographically the easiest accessible metropolitan area from China by land, there were few Chinese people in Calcutta until the late British Raj era; Chinese immigrants chose to go to Burma instead. One of the first persons of Chinese origin to arrive in Calcutta was Yang Tai Chow (a.k.a. Tong Achew and Yang Da Zhao) who arrived in 1778. Governor-General of India Warren Hastings granted land to Achew to set up a sugar cane plantation and sugar factory in a place, currently called Achipur, located near the town of Budge-Budge on the banks of the River Hoogly. According to records of the East India Company from the year 1778, "Achew was granted 650 bighas of land about 6 miles south of Budge – Budge for an annual rent of Rs 45". Many of the earliest Chinese immigrants worked on the Khidderpore docks. A police report in 1788 mentions a sizable Chinese population settled in the vicinity of Bow Bazaar Street. The sugar mill that Atchew had set up in the patch of land near the town of Budge Budge drew other Chinese migrants and soon a small community had formed around it. By 1783, we know Atchew was dead – a letter shows an East India Company attorney trying to extract money from the executor of his estate. An advertisement in the Calcutta Gazette in 1804 announces that the sugar mill was up for sale. Achew's grave it Achipur Chinese Temple still remain and are visited by many Chinese who come from the city during the Chinese New Year. After Tong Achew's death the Cantonese community moved to Tiretta Bazaar in Calcutta.

A later British census found that there were only 362 Chinese people in Calcutta in 1837. A common meeting place was the Temple of Guan Yu, the god of war, located in the Chinese quarter near Dharmatolla. They are all men and came to help assist the British carpentry business after the destruction from British colonial famines in India.

In Assam, after the establishment of tea gardens in Assam, the British authorities encouraged the migration of Chinese labourers, artisans, tea growers and tea makers, who were then employed in the burgeoning British owned tea gardens. The migration started in 1838. They soon surmounted the language barrier and started intermingling, many of the Chinese married local women and established a new society in Assam. Instances of intermarriage grew to the point where it became hard to physically differentiate Chinese immigrants in Assam from the locals during the period of their internment during the 1962 Sino-Indian War. A series of voluntary migrations of Chinese from China followed. This broadened the space of the newly established society and made it more multi-cultural and multi-ethnic as the migrants married local girls and settled down. Their physical features changed; the descendants forgot the Chinese language. Through sheer hard work and perseverance, the dislocated Chinese made a new life for themselves and prospered. Many 'China Patty,’ or small China towns, sprang up in different parts of Assam – of which the China Patty of Makum was the biggest.

According to Alabaster, there were lard manufacturers and shoemakers in addition to carpenters. Running tanneries and working with leather was traditionally not considered a respectable profession among upper-caste Hindus, and work was relegated to lower caste muchis and chamars. There was a high demand, however, for high quality leather goods in colonial India, one that the Chinese were able to fulfill. Alabaster also mentions licensed opium dens run by native Chinese and a Cheena Bazaar where contraband was readily available. Opium, however, was not illegal until after Indian independence in 1947. Immigration increased significantly in the 1930s and 1940s because of the Japanese invasion of China and resulting war. In the early 1900s, the Hakka community was relocated to the Tangra area, where they set up leather tanneries and Chinese restaurants.

=== Sino-Indian War ===
Chinese in India faced accusations of anti-Indian sentiment by the Indians during the Sino Indian war of 1962. After the war, India passed the Defence of India Act in December 1962, permitting the "apprehension and detention in custody of any person [suspected] of being of hostile origin." The broad language of the act allowed for the arrest of any person simply for having a Chinese surname, a drop of Chinese blood, or a Chinese spouse. Under the draconian law, 10,000 people of Chinese origin were estimated to have been detained at the desert prison camp in Deoli, Rajasthan. All of them were accused of being spies, but not a single charge has ever been proven. In 1964, many internees were forcibly and arbitrarily deported, resulting in the breakup of many families. The rest were released starting in 1965. The last internees were released from Deoli in mid-1967, after four and half years of captivity.

The Chinese population in Calcutta decreased by half, from 20,000 to 10,000. Those who remained were seen as enemies, and most could not hold any job except in the restaurant, tanning, and shoemaking businesses. Moreover, their movements were restricted. They were required to report to designated police stations once a month, and until the mid-1990s, they had to apply for special permits to travel more than a few kilometres from their homes.

The situation was alleviated when India and China resumed diplomatic relations in 1976. However, it was not until 1998 that ethnic Chinese were allowed naturalized Indian citizenship. In 2005, the first road sign in Chinese characters was put up in Chinatown, Tangra.

In Assam, Chinese people living in different places were rounded up by the armed forces and compelled to leave their houses. The administration told them they would be shifted to a safer place for two or three days. They were not allowed to take anything with them except papers. In the Makum area, they were picked up and packed into a cowshed, from where they were taken to the Dibrugarh jail. In other parts they were arrested and brought to the police station and put in jails. They were then asked to board a closed train, which took them to the Deoli internment camp in Rajasthan. It was a long, seven-day journey of utter suffering. Infants, pregnant women, the old and the sick were also arrested and sent to the camp, violating all human rights. After some time the Government of India decided to deport the interned back to China in a few batches. In this process, the already divided families were divided again as the government selected the names randomly. The majority of them were deported to China. Many Indian (Assamese) wives also accompanied their husbands to China with their children. The interned people who were allowed to return to their places after a couple of years again faced a difficult situation. The property of most of the people had been auctioned as enemy property. There was no society and no government to support them. They were compelled to live in sheer misery and isolation. Most of them did not get to meet their deported family members ever again.

== Indian Chinese cuisine ==
Chinese Indians also contributed to the development of fusion Indian Chinese cuisine (Indo-Chinese cuisine), which is now an integral part of the Indian culinary scene. In particular Chinese influences on Bengali cuisine are pronounced.

== Communities ==
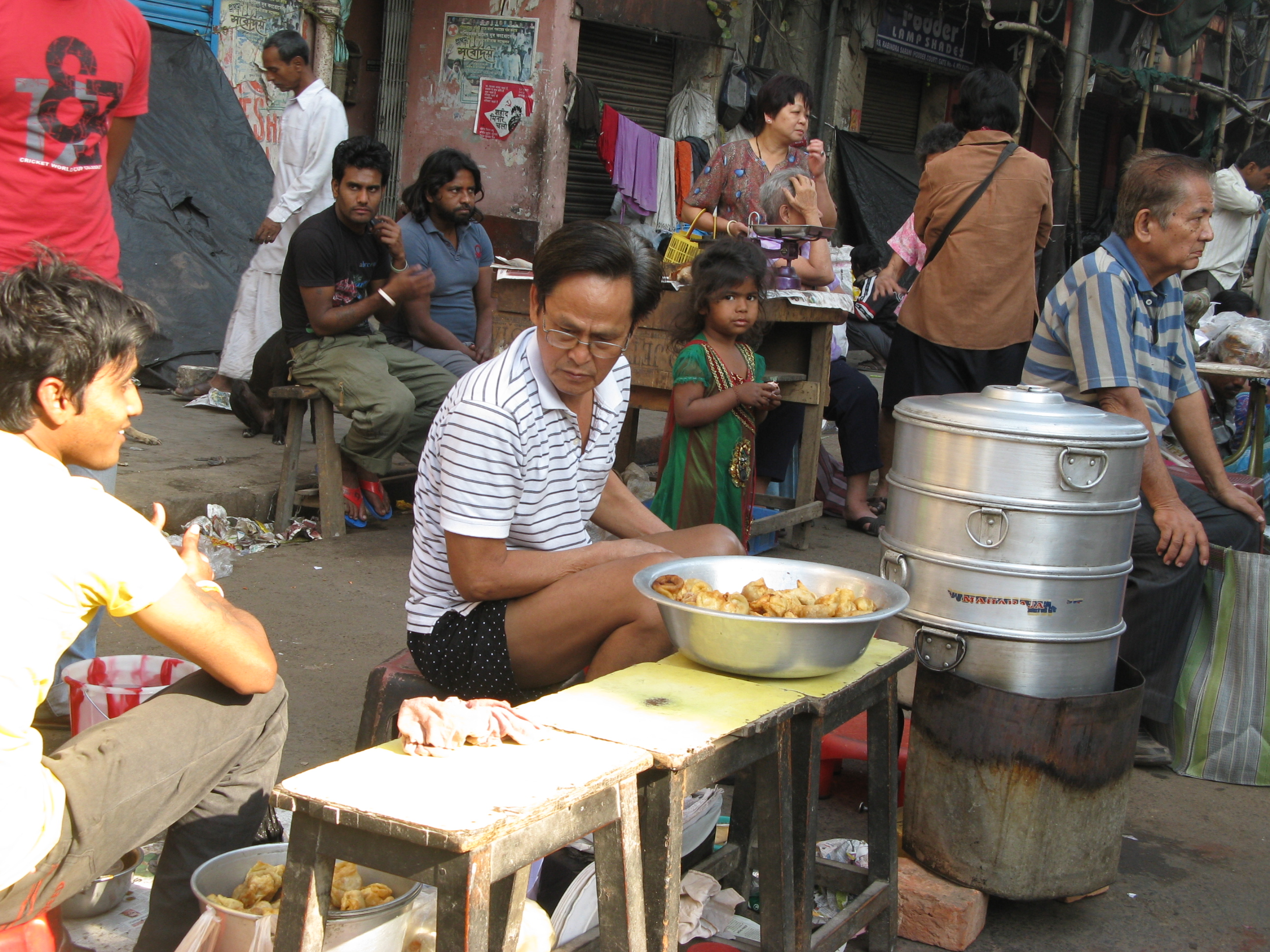
Chinese Breakfast at the Bazar.

=== Long term ===
Today they are located in ethnic neighbourhoods in Kolkata and Mumbai. In Mumbai, the population of Chinese origin stood at 4,000 in 2015. In 2013, there were 2,000 Chinese-origin people at Kolkata.

The most visible Chinese community in India is found in Kolkata where there are two Chinatowns. One exists in Tangra and an earlier Chinatown was established at Tiretta Bazaar, sometimes referred to as the old Chinatown. The Chinese presence at Tiretti Bazaar and Tangra has dwindled. The older generation of this community works as tannery-owners, sauce manufacturers, shoeshop owners, restaurateurs and beauty parlours owners. The new generation have gone in large numbers to dentistry. Many of the shoe shops lining Bentick Street, near Dharmatolla, are owned and operated by Chinese. The restaurants have given rise to fusions of Chinese and Indian culinary traditions in the widely available form of Indian Chinese cuisine. There is one Chinese newspaper published in Kolkata, The Overseas Chinese Commerce in India or Seong Pow (商报), but figures from 2005 show that sales have dwindled from 500 to 300 copies sold. At one time, 90% of the students of the Grace Ling Liang English School were ethnic Chinese. But in 2003 they comprised only about 15% of the 1500 students. Many of the Chinese of Kolkata are Christians due to the influence of missionary schools they studied in. Architecturally, a feature of the Chinese imprint on Kolkata are the Chinese temples. The Chinese/Lunar New Yearremains remains widely observed as well as Zhong Yuan Festival and Mid-Autumn Festival. The Chinese of Kolkata celebrate Chinese New Year with lion dance and dragon dance. It is celebrated either in the end of January or early February each year in accordance to the rotating lunar calendar of the particular year.

An exhaustive study of the Kolkata Chinese by Zhang Xing has recently been published.

=== Expatriates ===
Expatriate Chinese workers in India are concentrated in the cities of Mumbai, Delhi, Chennai and Bangalore. The Mumbai neighbourhood of Powai is described by the Economic Times as an "upcoming hub" for Chinese expats, who according to the newspaper "form close communities within themselves." Better integration of Chinese expats in their host communities is hampered by short time frames of stays, often durations only last for 2–3 years as part of a work contract. Also many in order to comply with visa regulations must routinely exit and leave India.

== Notable people ==
Notable Chinese origin persons include Chindian people who are of mixed Indian and Chinese ancestry.

- Jwala Gutta, Badminton player; Gutta's mother is of Chinese mixed Indian ancestry and father is Indian
- Lawrence Liang, legal researcher and lawyer
- Meiyang Chang, actor and singer
- Nelson Wang, restaurateur
- Anand Yang, historian
- Yan Law, football manager
- Jason Tham, dancer, choreographer and actor

== See also ==
- China–India relations
- Xuanzang & Great Tang Records on the Western Regions
- Chindian
- Chinas
- Indians in China
- Chinese temples in Kolkata
- Choong Ye Thong Cemetery
- Internment of Chinese-Indians (1962)
- Makum people
- Sino-Indian War (1962)
- Tibetan people in India
- Mongolians in India
