= Indians in China =

Ethnic group

Indians in China 中国的印度人 喺中国嘅印度人
- (15,051 in 2010)

Religion
- Hinduism and Buddhism

Related ethnic groups
- Indians in Korea, Indians in Japan

Indians in China are migrants from the Republic of India to the People's Republic of China and their descendants, the majority of whom are East Indians, mainly being from West Bengal and Bihar. There is also a significant proportion of North Indians (such as Himachal Pradesh and Sikkim). Only 550 Indians have citizenship in China. In modern times, there is a large long-standing community of Indians living in Hong Kong, often for descendants with several generations of roots and a growing population of students, traders and employees in mainland China.

The Sixth National Population Census of the People's Republic of China recording 15,051 Indian nationals living in mainland China as of 2010.

== History ==
=== Antiquity and Middle Ages ===
In the Records of the Grand Historian, Zhang Qian (d. 113 BC) and Sima Qian (145–90 BC) make references to "Shendu" (身毒) known as "Sindhu" in Sanskrit. When Yunnan was annexed by the Han dynasty in the first century, Chinese authorities reported an Indian "Shendu" community living there.

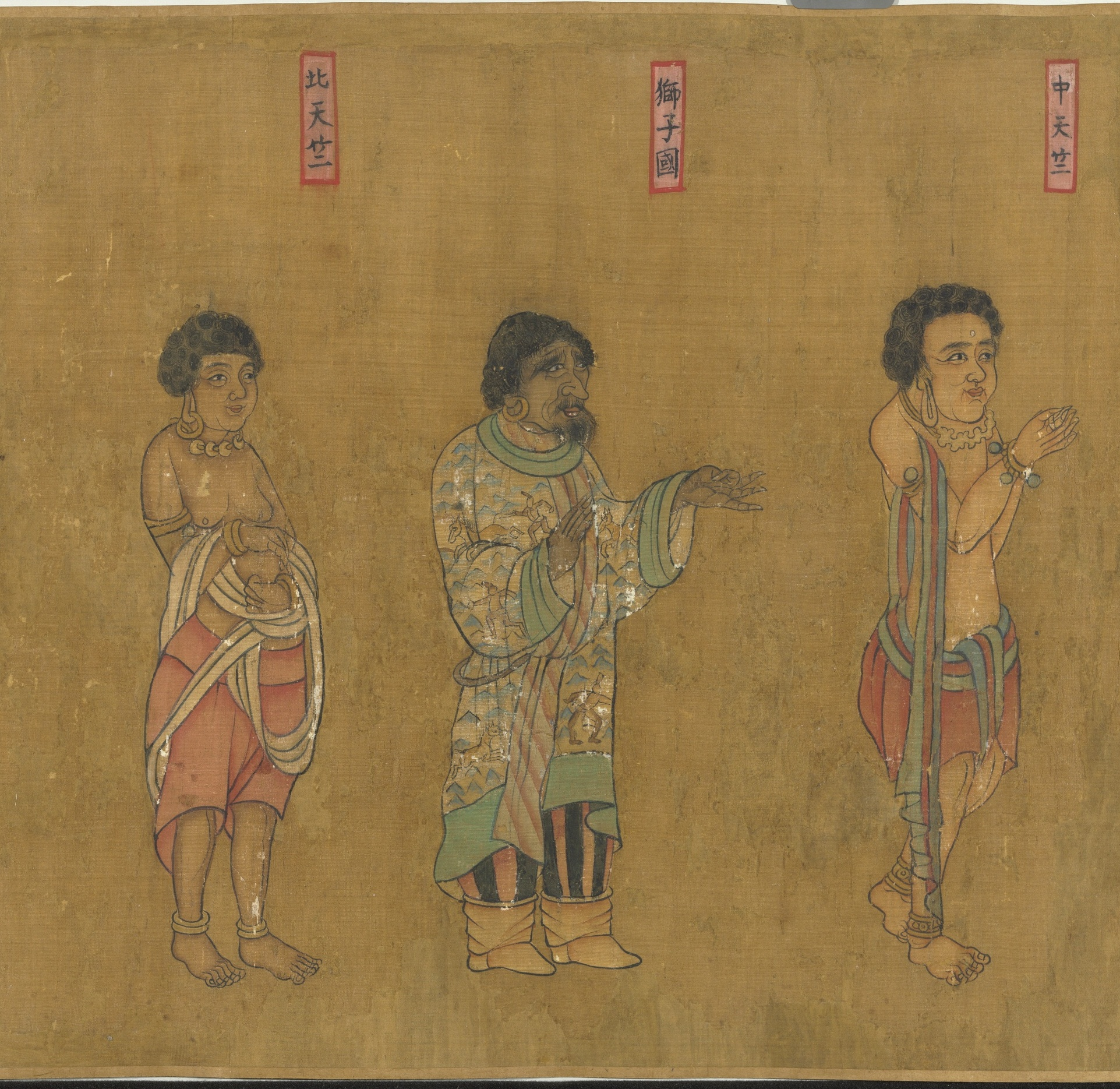
Northern Indian (left; 北天竺 Bei Tianzhu), Sri Lankan (middle; 獅子國 Shizi), and Central Indian (right; 中天竺 Zhong Tianzhu) envoys depicted in a Tang Dynasty-era painting of foreign emissaries to the Tang court by Yan Liben, China, circa 7th century.

Aurel Stein discovered 5 letters written in Sogdian known as the "Ancient Letters" in an abandoned watchtower near Dunhuang in 1907. A letter in the collection was written by the Sogdian Nanai-vandak addressed to Sogdians back home in Samarkand informing them about a mass rebellion by Xiongnu Hun rebels against their Han Chinese rulers of the Western Jin dynasty informing his people that every single one of the diaspora Sogdians and Indians in the Chinese Western Jin capital Luoyang died of starvation due to the uprising by the rebellious Xiongnu, who were formerly subjects of the Han Chinese. The Han Chinese emperor abandoned Luoyang when it came under siege by the Xiongnu rebels and his palace was burned down.

During the Yuan dynasty there was also a large Tamil Indian community in Quanzhou city and Jinjiang district who built more than a dozen Hindu temples or shrines, including two grand big temples in Quanzhou city. In 1271, a visiting Italian merchant recorded that the Indians "were recognised easily." "These rich Indian men and women mainly live on vegetables, milk and rice," he wrote. Due to the Ispah rebellion, most of the Tamil Indians were killed.

=== Colonial era ===
In the same century Indians from former Portuguese Indian Colonies (notably Goa) settled in Macau in small numbers.

The history of the Indians in Hong Kong could be drawn back since the day of British occupation. When the Union flag of the United Kingdom was hoisted on 26 January 1841, there were around 2,700 Indian troops participated. They had played an important role for the development of Hong Kong in early days. The most mentionable were the contributions of the set up of the University of Hong Kong (HKU) and the Hong Kong and Shanghai Banking Corporation (HSBC).

== People's Republic of China (mainland China) ==
The number in the mainland is growing rapidly with the Sixth National Population Census of the People's Republic of China recording 15,051 Indian nationals living in mainland China as of 2010. Other sources report more with a columnist for the Economic Times stating that the number of Indians in China was 45–48,000 in 2015. Many Indians in China are students, traders and professionals employed with MNCs, Indian companies and banks. There are three Indian community associations in the country.

=== Medical students ===
There are a total 23,000 Indian students in China in 2019 and among them 21,000 study medicine. Students from Andhra Pradesh are particularly well represented with 5,000 medical students in China reported in 2011.

The growth of Indian medical students at Chinese medical universities started in 2003 after the Medical Council of India (MCI) accepted Chinese medical degrees for qualification in India. For the academic year 2019–20, MCI recognised English language degrees from 45 universities and colleges in China. Chinese medical schools are attractive because of better infrastructure, labs and equipment, and lower cost with annual tuition around $4,000 in 2020, about half of the cost of private medical schools in India.

== Notable people ==
=== Historical ===
- Amoghavajra – One of the most politically powerful Buddhist monks in Chinese history.
- Bodhidharma – founder of shaolin monastery and zen Buddhism in China.
- Bodhiruci – Buddhist monk and esoteric master from India.
- Batuo – First abbot of Shaolin Monastery.
- Dhyānabhadra - Buddhist missionary who travelled to China during the Yuan dynasty.
- Huili – Indian Buddhist monk and founder of the Lingyin temple.
- Gautama Siddha – Chinese translator, astronomer, astrologer and compiler.
- Prabhakāramitra - monk and translator of Buddhist texts.
- Śāriputra - 15th century Buddhist monk who came to China during the Ming dynasty

== See also ==
- China–India relations
- Dwarkanath Kotnis – One of five Indian physicians dispatched to China during the Second Sino-Japanese War
- Chinas – People mentioned in ancient Indian religious texts
- Chinese people in India
- Chindian people
- Chindian cuisine
- Indians in Korea
- Hinduism in China
- Pakistanis in China
- Sino-Indian relations
- Mugat Ghorbati
