= Choong Ye Thong Cemetery =

Cemetery in Kolkata

Coordinates: 22°33′40″N 88°22′50″E

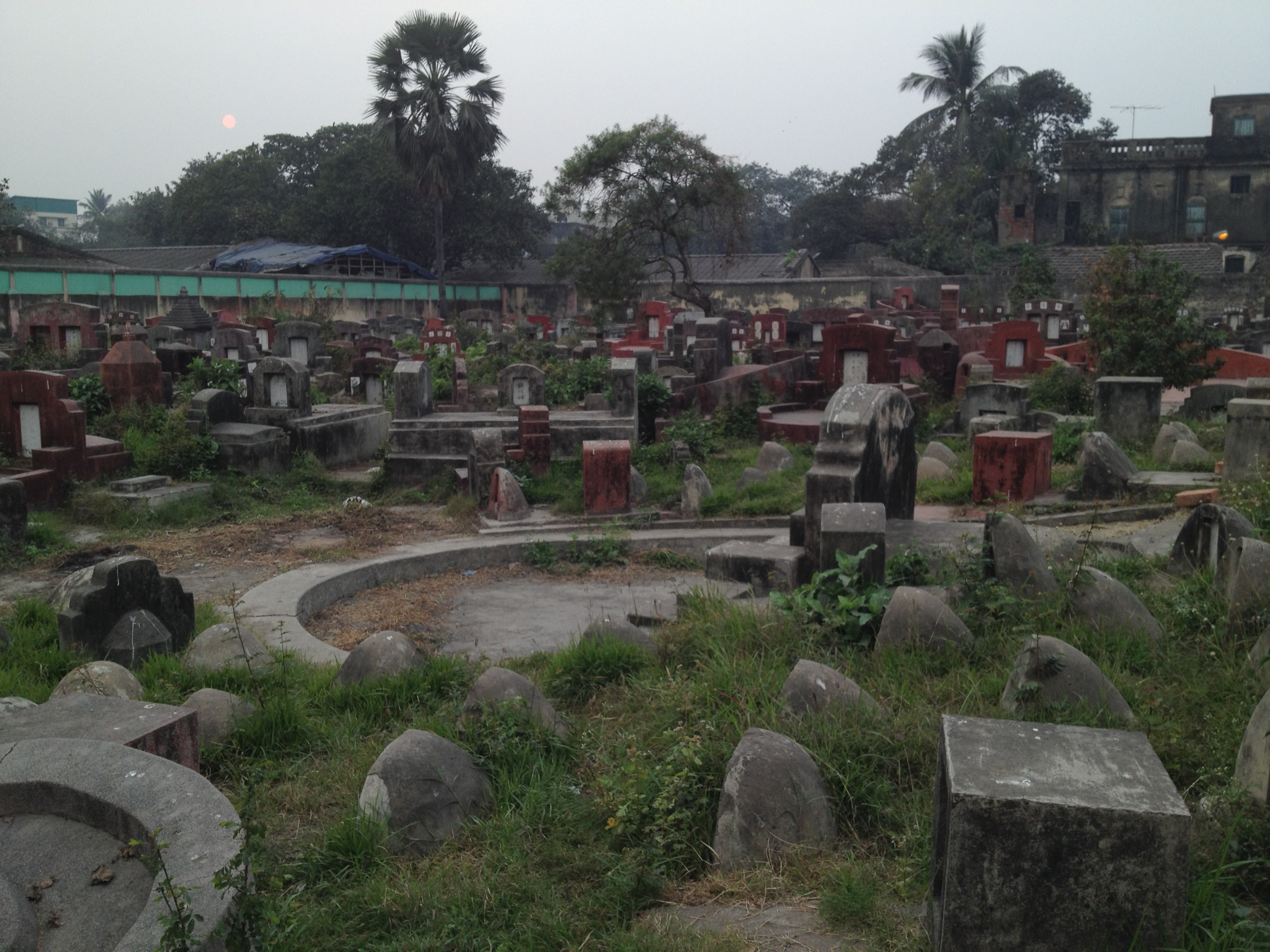
Choong Ye Thong cemetery

Choong Ye Thong Cemetery is the largest Chinese cemetery in Kolkata. This burial ground located at Tangra in Kolkata, in the Indian state of West Bengal.

== History ==
Choong Ye Thong Cemetery is designated as a Grade I Heritage by the Kolkata Municipal Corporation. It is the largest Chinese cemetery of Kolkata. The cemetery is managed by the Choong Ye Thong Club, a social organization established in the 1860s by Hsieh Qui Chong.
