= Tiriti Bazaar =

Tiriti Bazaar 蒂雷塔集市 টিরিটি বাজার Tiretta Bazaar, Old Chinatown, Kolkata Chinatown, Tereti Bazaar
- Neighborhood of Kolkata
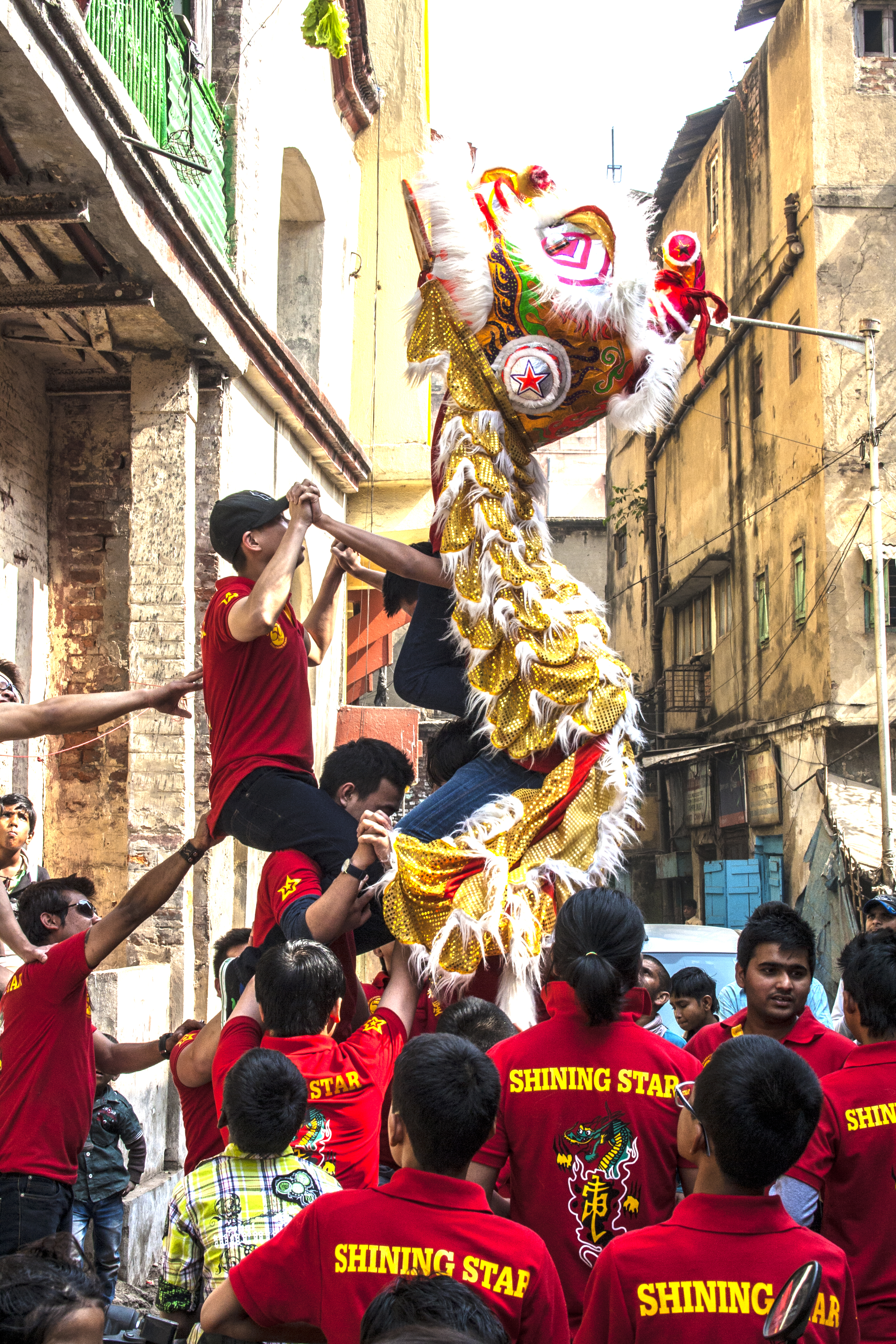
- Chinese New Year celebrations in Tiriti Bazaar in 2014
- Interactive map of Tiriti Bazaar
- Coordinates: 22°34′26″N 88°21′18″E
- Country: India
- State: West Bengal
- City: Kolkata
- District: Kolkata
- Metro Station: Central and Mahakaran
- Municipal Corporation: Kolkata Municipal Corporation
- KMC ward: 44
- Elevation: 36 ft (11 m)

Population
  - Total: For population see linked KMC ward pages
- Time zone: UTC+5:30 (IST)
- PIN: 700073
- Area code: +91 33
- Lok Sabha constituency: Kolkata Uttar
- Vidhan Sabha constituency: Chowranghee

Tiriti Bazaar
- Traditional Chinese: 蒂雷塔集市
- Simplified Chinese: 蒂雷塔集市
- Hakka: Di luiˇ tabˋ xib sii
Transcriptions
Standard Mandarin
- Hanyu Pinyin: Dì léi tǎ jí shì
Hakka
- Romanization: Di luiˇ tabˋ xib sii

Old China Market
- Traditional Chinese: 舊中國市場
- Simplified Chinese: 旧中国市场
- Hakka: Kiu zungˊ guedˋ sii congˇ
Transcriptions
Standard Mandarin
- Hanyu Pinyin: Jiù zhōngguó shìchǎng
Hakka
- Romanization: Kiu zungˊ guedˋ sii congˇ

Tiriti Bazaar, also known as Chinatown, & also spelled as Tiretta Bazaar is a neighborhood near Lalbazar in Central Kolkata. It is usually called Old China Market. The locality was once home to 20,000 ethnic Chinese Indian nationals, but now the population has dropped to approximately 2,000. Most of the Hakka Chinese people in the area moved closer to Tangra. The traditional occupation of the Chinese Indian community in Kolkata had been working in the nearby tanning industry as well as in Chinese restaurants. The area is still noted for the Chinese restaurants where many people flock to taste traditional Chinese and Indian Chinese cuisine.

== History ==
The bazaar is named after Edoardo Tiretta, an Italian immigrant from Venice, who was a land surveyor and owner in the area during late 18th-century.

During the time of Warren Hastings, the first governor-general of Bengal, a businessman by the name of Tong Achew established a sugar mill, along with a sugar plantation at Achipur, 33 kilometres (21 mi) from Calcutta, on the bank of the Hooghly River near the town of Budge Budge. A temple and the grave of Tong Achew still remain and are visited by many Chinese Indians, who arrive from the city to celebrate Chinese New Year.

One of the earliest records of immigration to India from China can be found in a short treatise from 1820. This records hints that the first wave of immigration was of Hakkas but does not elaborate on the professions of these immigrants. According to a later police census, there were 362 Chinese in Calcutta in 1837. A common meeting place was the Temple of Lord Guan, the Martial God of Loyalty & Righteousness, located in the Chinese quarter near Dharmatolla. A certain C. Alabaster mentions in 1849 that Cantonese carpenters congregated in the Bow Bazar Street area. As late as 2006, Bow Bazar is still noted for carpentry, but few of the workers or owners are now Indians of Chinese origin.

According to Alabaster, there were lard manufacturers and shoemakers in addition to carpenters. Running tanneries and working with leather were traditionally not considered "respectable" professions among upper-caste Hindus, and work was relegated to the so-called "lower caste" muchis and chamars. Nevertheless, there was a significant demand for high quality leather goods in colonial India, which Chinese Indians were able to fulfill. Alabaster also mentions "licensed" opium dens, run by "native Chinese" and a "Cheena Bazaar", where "contraband" was readily available. Opium, however, was not illegal until after India's Independence from Great Britain in 1947. Immigration continued freely through the turn of the century and during World War I partly due to political upheavals in China, including the First and Second Opium Wars, the First Sino-Japanese War and the Yihetuan Movement. Around the time of the First World War, the first Chinese-owned tanneries sprang up.

== Transport ==
=== Road ===
Chittaranjan Avenue (C.R. Avenue) and Rabindra Sarani pass through the area from north to south. Bepin Behari Ganguly Street (B.B. Ganguly Street) and Kshirode Vidyavinode Avenue (New CIT Road) pass through the area from east to west. Many bus routes follow these roads.

=== Train ===
Sealdah Station and B.B.D Bag railway station are the nearest railway stations of Tiretta Bazaar.

== Gallery ==
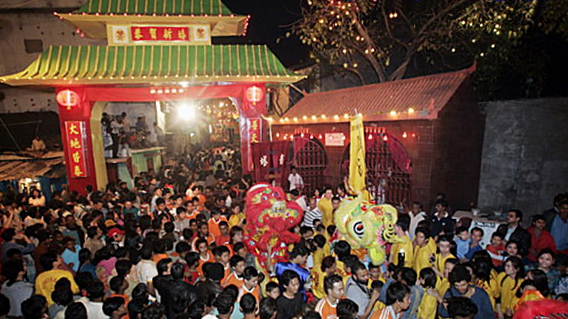
The Chinese New Year celebrated in Chinatown

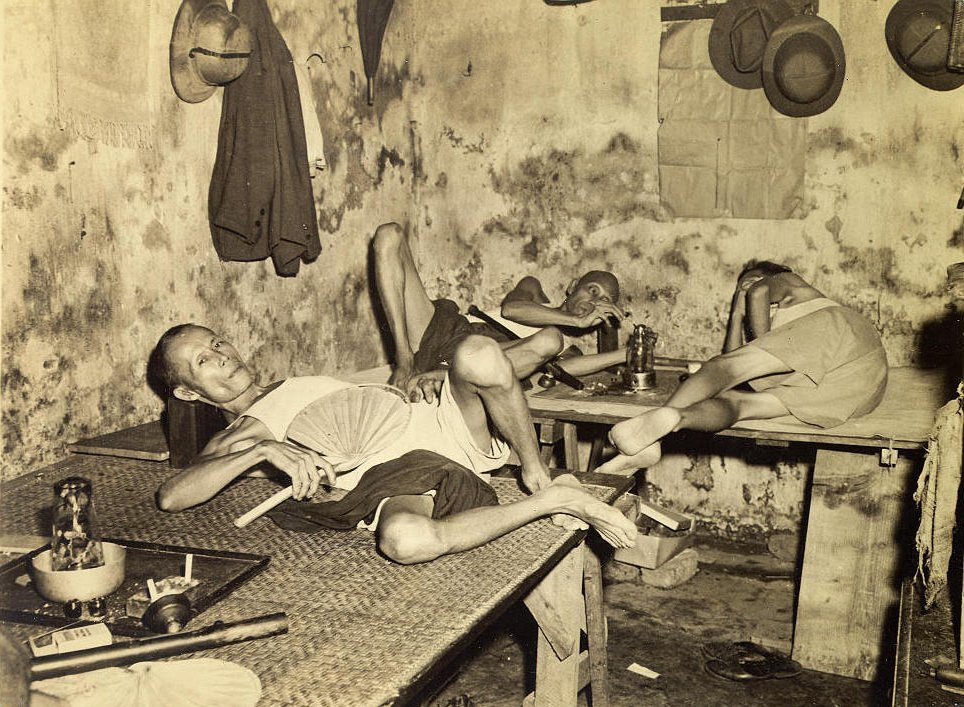
An opium den in the Chinatown, Kolkata, 1945

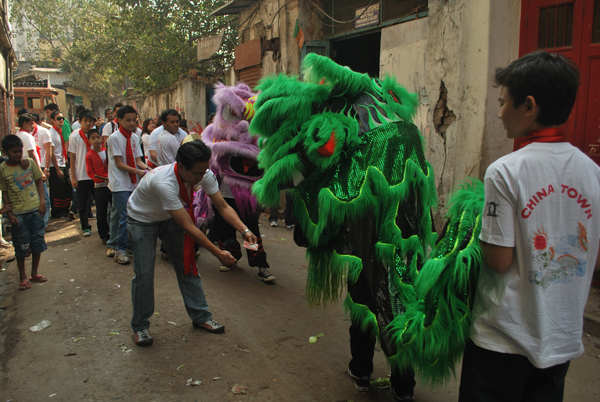
Chinese New Year Celebration, Kolkata

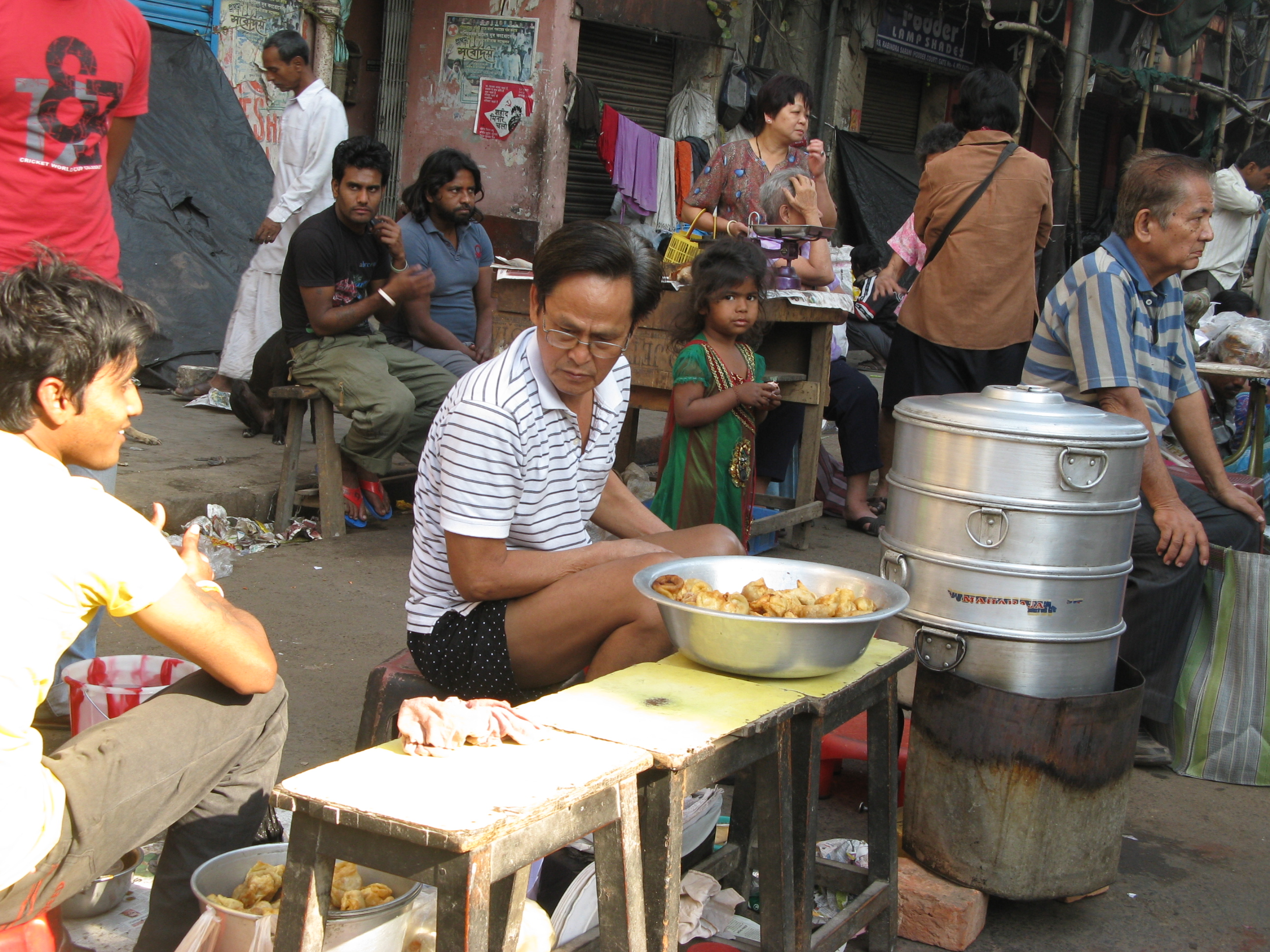
Morning Chinese Breakfast at Tiriti Bazaar

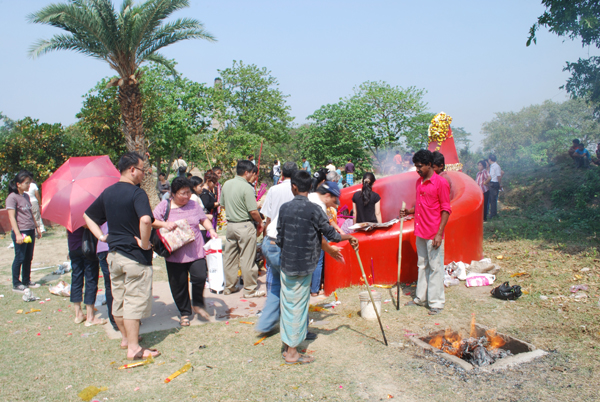
Chinese New Year Celebration, Achipur, near Kolkata

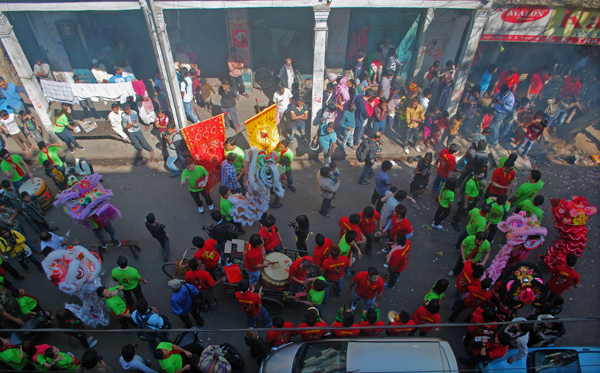
The Chinese New Year celebrated in Kolkata

== See also ==
- Chinese temples in Kolkata
- Chinese of Calcutta
- Tangra, Calcutta
- Indian Chinese cuisine
