= R. Ranga Rao =

R. Ranga Rao may refer to:

- R. Ranga Rao (administrator)
- Ramaswamy Ranga Rao
