= Dabeeru C. Rao =

American geneticist

- Born: 6 April 1946 (age 80); Santhabommali, Andhra Pradesh, India
- Citizenship: American
- Education: Indian Statistical Institute
- Known for: Path analysis
- Awards: Elected a fellow of the American Statistical Association (2013)
- Scientific career
- Fields: Statistical genetics
- Workplaces: Washington University in St. Louis; University of Hawaiʻi at Mānoa
- Thesis: A Statistical Study of Tongue Pigmentation in Man (1971)
- Doctoral advisor: C. R. Rao

Dabeeru C. Rao (born 6 April 1946) is an Indian-American statistical geneticist. He is professor and director of the Division of Biostatistics at Washington University School of Medicine.

Born in 1946, Rao was educated at the Indian Statistical Institute, where he received his Ph.D. in 1971. His Ph.D. thesis was entitled A Statistical Study of Tongue Pigmentation in Man, and his doctoral advisor was C. R. Rao. From 1971 to 1979, he was a geneticist in the University of Hawaii's Population Genetics Laboratory, where he worked with Newton Morton. In 1980, he joined the faculty of Washington University School of Medicine as associate professor and founding director of the Division of Biostatistics. He was promoted to full professor there in 1982, and has remained director of the Division of Biostatistics since 1980.

Rao was the president of the International Genetic Epidemiology Society in 1996, and served as the founding editor-in-chief of its official journal, Genetic Epidemiology, in 1984. He was elected a fellow of the American Statistical Association in 2013.
