= Jayne Woodside =

British nutritionist and academic

Jayne Valerie Woodside
- Education: Queen's University Belfast
- Scientific career
- Workplaces: Queen's University Belfast
- Thesis: Micronutrients in hyperhomocysteinaemia and cardiovascular risk (1994)

Jayne Valerie Woodside is a British nutritionist who is Professor of Human Nutrition at the Institute for Global Food Security at Queen's University Belfast. Her research considers human nutrition intervention with whole foods. She is on the Board of Trustees of The Nutrition Society.

== Early life and education ==
Woodside went to the University of Oxford between 1991 and 1994, where she read Human Sciences. She completed her doctoral research at the Queen's University Belfast in 1997.

== Research and career ==
Woodside is interested in the role of diet and lifestyle in the prevention of chronic disease. She leads the UK Prevention Research Partnership activity on improving nutrition in UK schools. She builds a network that considers the food system across preschool, primary and secondary, which provides advice on children's dietary requirements and looks to eliminate nutritional inequality. She argued that it was essential to increase monitoring of school food across the United Kingdom.

Woodside investigates the use of biomarkers to understand dietary intake. She looked to understand whether biomarkers can be used to capture information on overall dietary intake or diet quality.

In 2021, Woodside's research showed that iodine deficiency was increasing, which she attributed to changing dietary preferences, farming practices and public health priorities. She has partly attributed this iodine deficiency to an increase in plant-based diets.

== Selected publications ==
- Claire T McEvoy; Norman Temple; Jayne Woodside (3 April 2012). "Vegetarian diets, low-meat diets and health: a review". Public Health Nutrition. 15 (12): 2287–2294. doi:10.1017/s1368980012000936. ISSN 1368-9800. PMID 22717188. Wikidata Q34282963.
- Sarah F Brennan; Marie M Cantwell; Chris R Cardwell; Louiza S Velentzis; Jayne V Woodside (May 2010). "Dietary patterns and breast cancer risk: a systematic review and meta-analysis". The American Journal of Clinical Nutrition. 91 (5): 1294–302. doi:10.3945/ajcn.2009.28796. ISSN 0002-9165. PMID 20219961. Wikidata Q28275629.
- Harmon DL; Shields DC; Jayne Woodside; et al. (1 November 1999). "Methionine synthase D919G polymorphism is a significant but modest determinant of circulating homocysteine concentrations". Genetic Epidemiology. 17 (4): 298–309. doi:10.1002/(sici)1098-2272(199911)17:4<298::aid-gepi5>3.0.co;2-v. ISSN 0741-0395. PMID 10520212. Wikidata Q73080358.
