= Robin Hudson =

Robin Hudson may refer to:

- Robin E. Hudson (born 1952), American jurist
- Robin Lyth Hudson (born 1940), British mathematician
