= Sreenivasa Rao Jammalamadaka =

Indian-American statistician

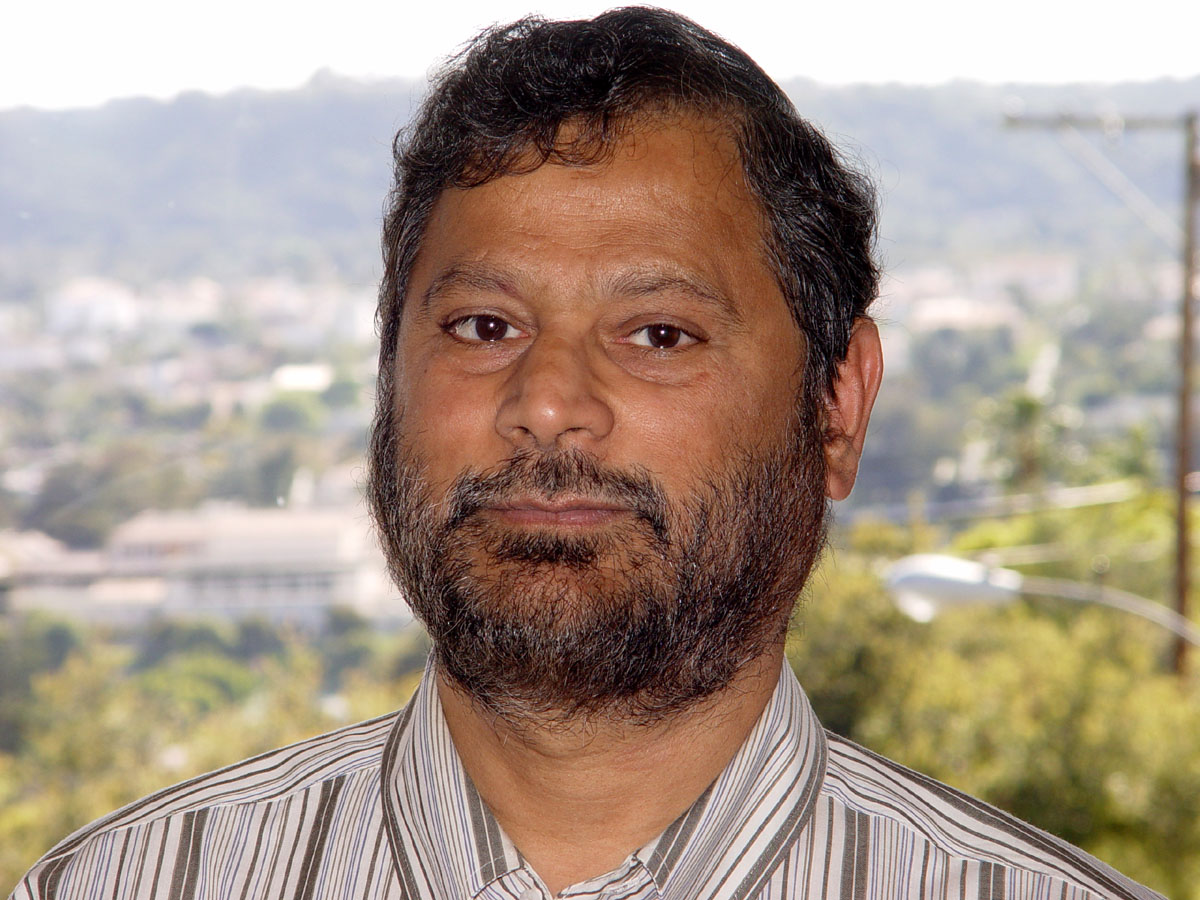
- Born: J. S. Rao; 7 December 1944 (age 81); Munipalle, Uppalaguptam Mandal, Andhra Pradesh, India
- Occupation: Statistician
- Known for: Directional statistics, goodness of fit tests, spacings, large sample theory
- Awards: Honorary Doctorate, Swedish University of Agricultural Sciences Outstanding Graduate Mentor Award, University of California, Santa Barbara C.R.Rao Lifetime Achievement Award from the Indian Society for Probability and Statistics

Academic background
- Education: Indian Statistical Institute, Kolkata
- Doctoral advisor: C. R. Rao

Academic work
- Discipline: Statistics, Probability
- Doctoral students: Siddhartha Chib
- Website: http://www.pstat.ucsb.edu/faculty/jammalam/

Sreenivasa Rao Jammalamadaka, also known as J.S. Rao, is an Indian-American statistician who is a Distinguished Professor in the Department of Statistics and Applied Probability at the University of California, Santa Barbara (UCSB). His research has focused on several areas including nonparametric statistical inference, goodness-of-fit testing, inference based on spacings, statistics of directional data in two- three- and higher dimensions, probability and large-sample theory, and linear models. He has also worked on Bayesian inference and development of statistical methodology in disciplines such as geology and biology. He has held professional and visiting appointments at universities and research institutions in the United States, Europe, Australia, and Asia. His honors include fellowships of most major statistical societies and "Lifetime Achievement Awards" from the Indian Society for Probability and Statistics (2019) and most recently from the International Indian Statistical Association (2025).

== Early life and education ==
Jammalamadaka was born in a small village called Munipalle, in Andhra Pradesh, India. He was educated for a year at the YRS and VRN College in Chirala, followed by the Indian Statistical Institute, Kolkata (B. Stat.1964, M.Stat. 1965, and Ph.D. 1969), while serving as a Research Scholar there during 1965-1969.

== Career ==
Jammalamadaka began his academic career at the Department of Mathematics, Indiana University, Bloomington, where he served as a Visiting Assistant Professor and Assistant Professor from 1969 to 1976. In 1976, he joined the University of California, Santa Barbara, as an Assistant Professor, progressing thro the ranks to become a Full Professor in 1983, and was appointed to the special rank of Distinguished Professor in 2007.

Jammalamadaka held visiting positions at the University of Wisconsin–Madison, the University of Leeds, Uppsala University, the Indian Statistical Institute, the Indian Institute of Technology Bombay, Chalmers University of Technology, the University of Gothenburg, the Australian National University, the Curtin University of Technology, the University of Malaya, Karlsruhe Institute of Technology, the University of Trento, the University of Queensland, the University of Geneva, and the Gandhi Institute of Technology and Management (GITAM), in India.

At UCSB, he served as vice-chairman of the Department of Mathematics, Director of the Statistical Consulting Center that he helped establish, Graduate Advisor in statistics, and as the first Chairman of the Department of Statistics and Applied Probability that he had a major role in getting started. He also served on several UCSB Academic Senate committees, including the Council on Planning and Budget, the Committee on Academic Personnel, and the Council on Faculty Issues and Awards.

Jammalamadaka's doctoral students, numbering over 50 at this point, include such well-known names as Martin Wells at Cornell, and Siddhartha Chib at the Olin Business School in Washington Univ, St. Louis. They have worked on topics including nonparametric testing, goodness-of-fit procedures, directional statistics, reliability theory, Bayesian methods, spatial statistics, financial modeling, image analysis, machine learning, and statistical inference. His teaching has included probability, statistical theory, sampling techniques, order statistics, experimental design, time-series analysis, multivariate analysis, stochastic processes, directional data analysis, statistical decision theory, and nonparametric statistics, besides math courses like calculus and linear algebra.

Jammalamadaka is the author of over 200 publications and has written 3 scholarly books and edited conference proceedings and other special volumes \https://jammalam.faculty.pstat.ucsb.edu/. For his research guidance and mentoring activity at UCSB and worldwide, the University of California, SB recognized him in 2017 with an Outstanding Graduate Mentor Award. His students and co-workers brought out a Festschrift in his honor in 2011.

== Research and scholarly works ==
Jammalamadaka's research has covered several areas of theoretical and applied statistics. His work includes nonparametric tests, asymptotic efficiencies statistical inference based on spacings, and statistical methods for circular and directional data.

His work on directional statistics addressed inference for observations represented by directions or angles and included goodness-of-fit tests, correlation and regression methods, and development of probability models for such data. His research interests also include limit distribution theory, asymptotic efficiencies of statistical tests, and linear models.

A recurring theme in his research has been the use of spacings the differences between ordered observations in statistical inference. His publications have examined the asymptotic properties and efficiencies of tests based on spacings, including applications to goodness-of-fit and two-sample problems.

Another major area of his work is directional and circular statistics. His research has included statistical inference for circular distributions, tests of uniformity, circular regression, wrapped probability distributions, skew-symmetric circular models, and statistical methods for spherical data. Later work extended these methods to applications involving biological and medical data, including circular functional analysis of Optical Coherence Tomography (OCT) data, and analysis of retinal nerve fiber layer measurements to explore connections to problems like glaucoma.

His research has also addressed goodness-of-fit testing, Bayesian and semiparametric inference, censored lifetime data, general linear models, multivariate statistics, time-series methods, and machine-learning-related statistical models. His publications include work on Bayesian structural time-series models, mixture models, generalized linear models, lifetime-data analysis, and statistical methods for multimodal and high-dimensional data. His later publications include studies of circular and spherical distributions, multivariate skewness and kurtosis, and applications of circular statistics to biological data as in chronobiology.

He has authored or coauthored books including Essential Statistics (1998), Topics in Circular Statistics (2001), Linear Models, An Integrated Approach (2003), Essential Statistics with Python and R (2019), and Linear Models and Regression with R (2019).

Jammalamadaka has served on editorial boards of several statistical journals. He founded and directed the Statistical Consulting Center (StatLab) at UCSB and has provided statistical consulting on problems ranging from environmental studies and engineering to medical and biological research.

== Awards ==
- Member, International Statistical Institute,1977
- Fellow, Institute of Mathematical Statistics, 1990
- Fellow, Institute of Combinatorics and its Applications, 1990
- Fellow, American Statistical Association, 1993
- Distinguished Service Award, International Indian Statistical Association, 2011
- Honorary doctorate, Swedish University of Agricultural Sciences, 2012
- Honorary Fellow, Indian Society for Probability and Statistics, 2014
- UCSB Outstanding Graduate Mentor Award, 2016–2017
- C. R. Rao Lifetime Achievement Award, Indian Society for Probability and Statistics, 2019
- Lifetime Achievement Award, International Indian Statistical Association, 2025

== Selected publications ==
=== Articles ===
- Rao, J. S.; Sethuraman, J. (1 January 1979). Asymptotic Normality and Efficiencies of Tests Based on Modified Spacings (Report). Fort Belvoir, VA: Defense Technical Information Center. doi:10.21236/ada065519.
- Rao, J. S.; Sethuraman, J. (1 March 1975). "Weak Convergence of Empirical Distribution Functions of Random Variables Subject to Perturbations and Scale Factors". The Annals of Statistics. 3 (2). doi:10.1214/aos/1176343058. ISSN 0090-5364.
- Kent, J. T.; Mardia, K. V.; Rao, J. S. (1 July 1979). "A Characterization of the Uniform Distribution on the Circle". The Annals of Statistics. 7 (4). doi:10.1214/aos/1176344737. ISSN 0090-5364.
- Holst, Lars; Rao, J. S. (1981). "Asymptotic spacings theory with applications to the two-sample problem". Canadian Journal of Statistics. 9 (1): 79–89. doi:10.2307/3315298. ISSN 0319-5724. JSTOR 3315298.
- Rao Jammalamadaka, S.; SenGupta, Ashis (1998). "Predictive inference for directional data". Statistics & Probability Letters. 40 (3): 247–257. doi:10.1016/s0167-7152(98)00101-1. ISSN 0167-7152.
- Gatto, Riccardo; Jammalamadaka, S. Rao (31 March 2015). "Directional Statistics: Introduction". Wiley StatsRef: Statistics Reference Online: 1–8. doi:10.1002/9781118445112.stat00201.pub2. ISBN 978-1-118-44511-2.
- Qiu, Jinwen; Jammalamadaka, S. Rao; Ning, Ning (4 September 2020). "Multivariate time series analysis from a Bayesian machine learning perspective". Annals of Mathematics and Artificial Intelligence. 88 (10): 1061–1082. doi:10.1007/s10472-020-09710-6. ISSN 1012-2443.
- Jammalamadaka, Sreenivasa Rao; Meintanis, Simos; Verdebout, Thomas (1 August 2020). "On Sobolev tests of uniformity on the circle with an extension to the sphere". Bernoulli. 26 (3). doi:10.3150/19-bej1191. hdl:2013/ULB-DIPOT:oai:dipot.ulb.ac.be:2013/335341. ISSN 1350-7265.
- Jammalamadaka, Sreenivasa Rao; Taufer, Emanuele; Terdik, Gyorgy H. (5 August 2020). "On Multivariate Skewness and Kurtosis". Sankhya A. 83 (2): 607–644. doi:10.1007/s13171-020-00211-6. ISSN 0976-836X.
- Jammalamadaka, S. Rao; Vaidyanathan, V. S. (3 January 2024). "Clustering Circular Data via Finite Mixtures of von Mises Distributions and an Application to Data on Wind Directions". Sankhya A. 86 (1): 575–595. doi:10.1007/s13171-023-00337-3. ISSN 0976-836X.
- Wainwright, Brian; Ghasemi, Erfan; Ali, Md. Hasnat; Ray, Meghana; Pyne, Saumyadipta; Jammalamadaka, S. Rao (4 August 2025). "Circadian Gene Expression Analysis Using an Enhanced Circular Functional Framework". Sankhya B. 88 (1): 662–682. doi:10.1007/s13571-025-00379-7. ISSN 0976-8386.

=== Books ===
- Jammalamadaka, S. Rao; SenGupta, Ashis (2001). Topics in Circular Statistics. Singapore: World Scientific. ISBN 978-9810237783.
- Essential Statistics with Python and R
- Sengupta, D.; Rao, J. S. (2019). Linear Models and Regression with R: An Integrated Approach. World Scientific. ISBN 978-9811229282.
