= K. R. Parthasarathy (probabilist) =

Indian statistician (1936–2023)

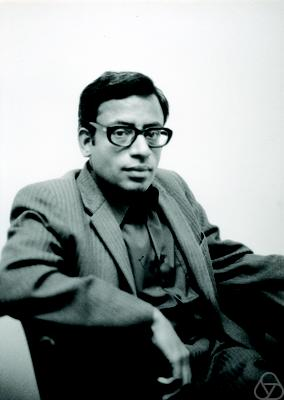
- Parthasarathy in 1975
- Born: Kalyanapuram Rangachari Parthasarathy; 25 June 1936; Madras, Madras Presidency, British India (now Chennai, Tamil Nadu, India)
- Died: 14 June 2023 (aged 86); Delhi, India
- Education: Ramakrishna Mission Vivekananda College; Indian Statistical Institute
- Known for: Quantum stochastic calculus
- Spouse: Shyama Parthasarathy
- Children: 2
- Awards: Shanti Swarup Bhatnagar Award; TWAS Prize
- Scientific career
- Fields: Mathematics
- Workplaces: Indian Statistical Institute
- Doctoral advisor: C. R. Rao

Kalyanapuram Rangachari Parthasarathy (25 June 1936 – 14 June 2023) was an Indian statistician who was professor emeritus at the Indian Statistical Institute and a pioneer of quantum stochastic calculus. Parthasarathy was the recipient of the Shanti Swarup Bhatnagar Prize for Science and Technology in Mathematical Science in 1977 and the TWAS Prize in 1996.

== Biography ==
Parthasarathy was born on 25 June 1936 in Madras, into a modest but deeply religious Hindu Brahmin family. He completed his early years of schooling in Thanjavur, before moving back to Madras to complete his schooling from P. S. School in the Mylapore neighbourhood of the city. He went on to study at the Ramakrishna Mission Vivekananda College, where he completed the B.A. (Honours) course in Mathematics.

Parthasarathy then moved to Kolkata to attend the Research and Training school at the Indian Statistical Institute, where he completed his PhD, under the supervision of C. R. Rao in 1962. He was one of the "famous four" at ISI from 1956 to 1963, alongside Ramaswamy Ranga Rao, Veeravalli S. Varadarajan, and S. R. Srinivasa Varadhan. He was awarded the first Ph.D. degree of ISI.

He received the Shanti Swarup Bhatnagar Prize for Science and Technology in Mathematical Science in 1977 and The World Academy of Sciences (TWAS) Prize for Mathematics in 1996.

Parthasarathy was married to Shyama Parthasarathy. The couple had two sons. Parthasarathy died in Delhi on 14 June 2023, at the age of 86.

== Research ==
Parthasarathy started his work on theoretical probability during his time at the Indian Statistical Institute. He later worked at the Steklov Mathematical Institute, USSR Academy of Sciences (1962–63), as lecturer where he collaborated with Andrey Kolmogorov. During this time, he continued to focus on the foundations of probability theory. Later he came to the United Kingdom as a Professor of Statistics at University of Sheffield (1964–68), University of Manchester (1968–70) and later at University of Nottingham where he collaborated with Robin Lyth Hudson on their pioneering work in quantum stochastic calculus.

After returning to India, he spent a few years at Bombay University and the Indian Institute of Technology, Delhi, before returning to the new Indian Statistical Institute, Delhi Centre in 1976, where he spent the next 20 years before retiring in 1996. He continued to remain as a professor emeritus at the institute until the early 2020s.

Parthasarathy is the namesake of Parthasarathy–Ranga Rao–Varadarajan determinants along with S.R.S. Varadhan, R. Ranga Rao and Veeravalli S. Varadarajan, which they introduced in 1967. The PRV paper arose out of the grand program of Harish-Chandra on the representation theory of real connected semisimple Lie groups. He collaborated with Ranga Rao and Varadarajan to write a paper on representation theory of lie groups referred to as the PRV paper that was the foundation for further research on this topic.

In addition to pioneering contributions to quantum stochastic calculus, some of Parthasarathy's research areas included quantum probability, foundations of quantum mechanics, information theory, stochastic processes, and group representations. He also served on many governmental committees.

== Published works ==
=== Books ===
- K. R. Parthasarathy. Probability measures on metric spaces. Vol. 352. American Mathematical Society, 1967.
- Parthasarathy, K. R.; Schmidt, K. (1972). Positive Definite Kernels, Continuous Tensor Products, and Central Limit Theorems of Probability Theory. Springer. ISBN 978-3-540-37607-1.
- Parthasarathy, K. R. (1992). An Introduction to Quantum Stochastic Calculus. Springer Science & Business Media. ISBN 978-3-7643-2697-5.
- Parthasarathy, K. R. (2005). Probability Measures on Metric Spaces. American Mathematical Soc. ISBN 978-0-8218-3889-1.
- Parthasarathy, K. R. (2005). Introduction to Probability and Measure. Springer. ISBN 978-93-86279-27-9.

=== Papers ===
- Hudson, R. L.; Parthasarathy, K. R. (1984). "Quantum Ito's formula and stochastic evolutions". Communications in Mathematical Physics. 93 (3): 301–323. Bibcode:1984CMaPh..93..301H. doi:10.1007/BF01258530. ISSN 1432-0916. S2CID 122848524.
- Parthasarathy, K. R.; Rao, R. Ranga; Varadarajan, V. S. (1967). "Representations of Complex Semi-Simple Lie Groups and Lie Algebras". Annals of Mathematics. 85 (3): 383–429. doi:10.2307/1970351. ISSN 0003-486X. JSTOR 1970351.
- Parthasarathy, K R (2010). "What is a Gaussian state?". Communications on Stochastic Analysis. 4 (2). doi:10.31390/cosa.4.2.02. ISSN 0973-9599.
- Krishna, M.; Parthasarathy, K. R. (2002). "An Entropic Uncertainty Principle for Quantum Measurements". Sankhyā: The Indian Journal of Statistics, Series A (1961-2002). 64 (3): 842–851. ISSN 0581-572X. JSTOR 25051432.
- Bhatia, Rajendra; Parthasarathy, K. R. (2000). "Positive Definite Functions and Operator Inequalities". Bulletin of the London Mathematical Society. 32 (2): 214–228. doi:10.1112/S0024609399006797. S2CID 14312608.</ref>
- Hudson, R. L.; Parthasarathy, K. R. (1986). "Unification of fermion and Boson stochastic calculus". Communications in Mathematical Physics. 104 (3): 457–470. Bibcode:1986CMaPh.104..457H. doi:10.1007/BF01210951. ISSN 1432-0916. S2CID 123132851.
- Parthasarathy, K. R. (1988). "The passage from random walk to diffusion in quantum probability". Journal of Applied Probability. 25 (A): 151–166. doi:10.2307/3214153. ISSN 0021-9002. JSTOR 3214153. S2CID 119819984.
- Hudson, R. L.; Parthasarathy, K. R. (1984). Bratteli, Ola; Jørgensen, Palle E. T. (eds.). Stochastic Dilations of Uniformly Continuous Completely Positive Semigroups. Dordrecht: Springer Netherlands. pp. 353–378. doi:10.1007/978-94-009-6484-6_6. ISBN 978-94-009-6484-6. S2CID 119829682.
- Parthasarathy, K. R.; Sengupta, Ritabrata (2015). "From particle counting to Gaussian tomography". Infinite Dimensional Analysis, Quantum Probability and Related Topics. 18 (4): 1550023–1550497. arXiv:1504.07054. Bibcode:2015IDAQP..1850023P. doi:10.1142/S021902571550023X. ISSN 0219-0257. S2CID 73693185.
- Parthasarathy, K (2005). "Extremal quantum states in coupled systems". Annales de l'Institut Henri Poincaré B. 41 (3): 257–268. arXiv:quant-ph/0307182. Bibcode:2005AIHPB..41..257P. doi:10.1016/j.anihpb.2003.10.009. S2CID 14210453.
- Rajarama Bhat, B. V.; Parthasarathy, K. R. (1995). "Markov dilations of nonconservative dynamical semigroups and a quantum boundary theory". Annales de l'Institut Henri Poincaré B. 31 (4): 601–651. ISSN 1778-7017.
- Parthasarathy, K. R., Ranga Rao, R., & Varadhan, S. R. S. (1962). On the category of indecomposable distributions on topological groups. Transactions of the American Mathematical Society, 102(2), 200-217.
