= Daniel W. Stroock =

American mathematician (1940–2025)

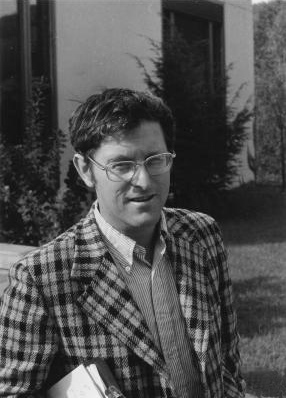
- Stroock in 1976
- Born: March 20, 1940; New York City, US
- Died: March 13, 2025 (aged 84)
- Education: Harvard University; Rockefeller University
- Known for: Diffusion process Malliavin calculus
- Awards: Steele Prize (1996)
- Scientific career
- Fields: Mathematics
- Workplaces: Courant Institute; University of Colorado, Boulder; MIT
- Doctoral advisor: Mark Kac

Daniel Wyler Stroock (March 20, 1940 – March 13, 2025) was an American mathematician and probabilist.

== Biography ==
Stroock received his undergraduate degree from Harvard University in 1962 and his doctorate from Rockefeller University in 1966. He taught at the Courant Institute of Mathematical Sciences and the University of Colorado, Boulder, before joining the Massachusetts Institute of Technology Mathematics faculty in 1984. He is known for his work with S. R. S. Varadhan on diffusion processes, for which he received the Leroy P. Steele Prize for Seminal Contribution to Research in 1996.

Stroock was a member of the U.S. National Academy of Sciences.^{,} In 2012 he became a fellow of the American Mathematical Society.

== Selected publications ==
- Stroock, Daniel W. (1973). "On a conjecture of M. Kac". Bull. Amer. Math. Soc. 79 (4): 770–775. doi:10.1090/s0002-9904-1973-13309-9. MR 0322345.
- with S. R. S. Varadhan: Multidimensional diffusion processes. Springer. 1979.; reprintings 1997, 2006
- An introduction to the theory of large deviations. Springer-Verlag. 1984.
- with Andrzej Korzeniowski: Korzeniowski, Andrzej; Stroock, Daniel W. (1985). "An example in the theory of hypercontractive semigroups". Proc. Amer. Math. Soc. 94 (1): 87–90. doi:10.1090/s0002-9939-1985-0781062-0. MR 0781062.
- with Jean-Dominique Deuschel: Large deviations. Academic Press. 1989. ISBN 9780821869345.; reprinting 2001
- A concise introduction to the theory of integration. World Scientific. 1990.; Birkhäuser, 2nd edition 1994; Stroock, Daniel W. (1999). 3rd edition. Springer. ISBN 9780817640736.
- Probability theory: an analytic view. Cambridge U. Press. 1993. ISBN 9781139494618.
- Stroock, Daniel W. (1996). "Gaussian measures in traditional and not so traditional settings". Bull. Amer. Math. Soc. (N.S.). 33 (2): 135–155. doi:10.1090/s0273-0979-96-00655-6. MR 1362627.
- An introduction to the analysis of paths on a Riemannian manifold. AMS. 2000. ISBN 9780821838396.
- Markov processes from K. Itô's perspective. Princeton U. Press. 2003. ISBN 978-0691115436.
- An introduction to Markov processes. Springer. 2005. ISBN 9783540234999.
- Essentials of integration theory for analysis. Springer. 2011.
- Mathematics of probability. AMS. 2013. ISBN 9781470409074.
