= Trombi–Varadarajan theorem =

Relates spherical functions on a semisimple Lie group to certain holomorphic functions

In mathematics, the Trombi–Varadarajan theorem, introduced by Trombi and Varadarjan (1971), gives an isomorphism between a certain space of spherical functions on a semisimple Lie group, and a certain space of holomorphic functions defined on a tubular neighborhood of the dual of a Cartan subalgebra.
