= Thomas F. Cooley =

American economist

- Born: January 3, 1943
- Died: 10 October 2021 (aged 78)

Academic background
- Education: Rensselaer Polytechnic Institute (BS); University of Pennsylvania (MA, PhD)
- Doctoral advisor: Edward C. Prescott

Academic work
- Institutions: New York University
- Doctoral students: Siddhartha Chib

Thomas Ferguson Cooley (January 3, 1943 – October 10, 2021) was the Paganelli-Bull Professor of Economics at the New York University Stern School of Business. He served as Dean of the Stern School from 2002 to January 2010. He was also a professor of economics in the NYU Faculty of Arts and Science. Cooley was a widely published scholar in the areas of macroeconomic theory, monetary theory and policy, and the financial behavior of firms.

He has authored more than 100 scholarly articles on economics and statistics and frequently wrote opinion pieces for a variety of economic and business publications.

== Biography ==
Responding to the 2008 financial crisis, he spearheaded a research and policy initiative that yielded 18 white papers by 33 NYU Stern professors, published as Restoring Financial Stability: How to Repair a Failed System, (Wiley, 2009). Together with Stern colleagues he edited and wrote a second book, Regulating Wall Street, The New Architecture of Global Finance, which was published by Wiley in 2010. His book, Understanding Business Cycles, Princeton University Press 1995, is a widely cited reference on macroeconomic fluctuations.

Cooley was a research associate of the National Bureau of Economic Research and a member of the Council on Foreign Relations. He is also the former president of the Society for Economic Dynamics, a Fellow of the Econometric Society, holds an honorary doctorate from the Stockholm School of Economics and was a National Science Foundation Fellow. In the corporate sector, Cooley has been a senior advisor and member of the board of managers of Standard & Poors, served on the board of directors of Thornburg Mortgage and has been an advisor to Ameriprise and eTrade Securities.

Cooley received his Ph.D., and M.A. in economics from University of Pennsylvania. He received his B.S. in engineering science from Rensselaer Polytechnic Institute. Before joining Stern, he was a professor of economics at the University of Rochester, University of Pennsylvania, and UC Santa Barbara. At University of Rochester, he received numerous Superior Teaching Awards from the Simon School of Business and the Rochester-Erasmus Executive MBA Program. Prior to his academic career, he was a systems engineer for IBM Corporation.

He also holds a doctorem honoris causa from the Stockholm School of Economics. Prior to his academic career, Cooley was a systems engineer for IBM Corporation.

Before joining NYU Stern, Cooley was a professor of economics at the University of Rochester, University of Pennsylvania, and UC Santa Barbara. He was also the former president of the Society for Economic Dynamics and a Fellow of the Econometric Society.

Cooley was a member of the Council of Foreign Relations. He also wrote a weekly column for Forbes.com.
