= Sanjay Shete =

Indian-American Statistician

- Born: 1968 (age 57–58); India
- Education: Shivaji University; The University of Georgia; Indian Statistical Institute
- Scientific career
- Fields: Epidemiology; Statistics; Biostatistics; Behavioural Genetics
- Workplaces: The University of Texas MD Anderson Cancer Center; Texas A&M University

Sanjay Shete (born 1968) is an Indian-American statistician and professor in statistical genetic, genetic epidemiology, behavioral genetics and biostatistics at The University of Texas MD Anderson Cancer Center. He is Barnhart Family Distinguished Professor in Targeted Therapies and section chief of behavioral and social statistics in the division of Quantitative Sciences. He is a fellow of the American Statistical Association. Currently, he is the editor-in-chief of the Genetic Epidemiology journal.

== Education ==
- 1987 – B.S., statistics, Shivaji University, Kolhapur, Maharashtra, India
- 1989 – M.S., statistics, Shivaji University, Kolhapur, Maharashtra, India
- 1990 – Master of Philosophy, statistics, Shivaji University, Kolhapur, Maharashtra, India
- 1993 – Research scholar in statistics, Indian Statistical Institute, Calcutta, West Bengal, India
- 1998 – PhD, statistics, The University of Georgia, Athens, GA

== Honors and awards ==
- 2014 – Barnhart Family Distinguished Professorship in Targeted Therapies
- 2014 – Fellow, American Association for the Advancement of Science
- 2014 – Fellow, Royal Statistical Society
- 2014 – IGES Leadership Award, International Genetic Epidemiology Society
- 2014 – Outstanding Service to Graduate Education, UT Graduate School of Biomedical Sciences (GSBS), Houston
- 2012 – Fellow, American Statistical Association
- 2011 – Editor-in-chief, Genetic Epidemiology (journal)
- 2010 – Member, Program Committee of International Genetic Epidemiology Society
- 2010 – Nominee, Distinguished Faculty Mentor Award
- 2009 – Nominee, 5th Annual Robert M. Chamberlain Distinguished Mentor Award
- 2008–2012 – Chartered member, Cardiovascular and Sleep Epidemiology (CASE) Study Section, NHLBI, NIH
- 2006–2010 – Associate editor, Biometrics
- 2006–2009 – Member, Ethical, Legal, and Social Issues Committee of International Genetic Epidemiology Society
- 2006 – Elected member, International Statistical Institute
- 2004–2005 – President, Houston Area chapter of American Statistical Association
