= C. N. R. Rao =

Indian chemist (born 1934)

C. N. R. Rao FNA, FASc, FRS, FTWAS, HonFRSC, MAE, HonFInstP
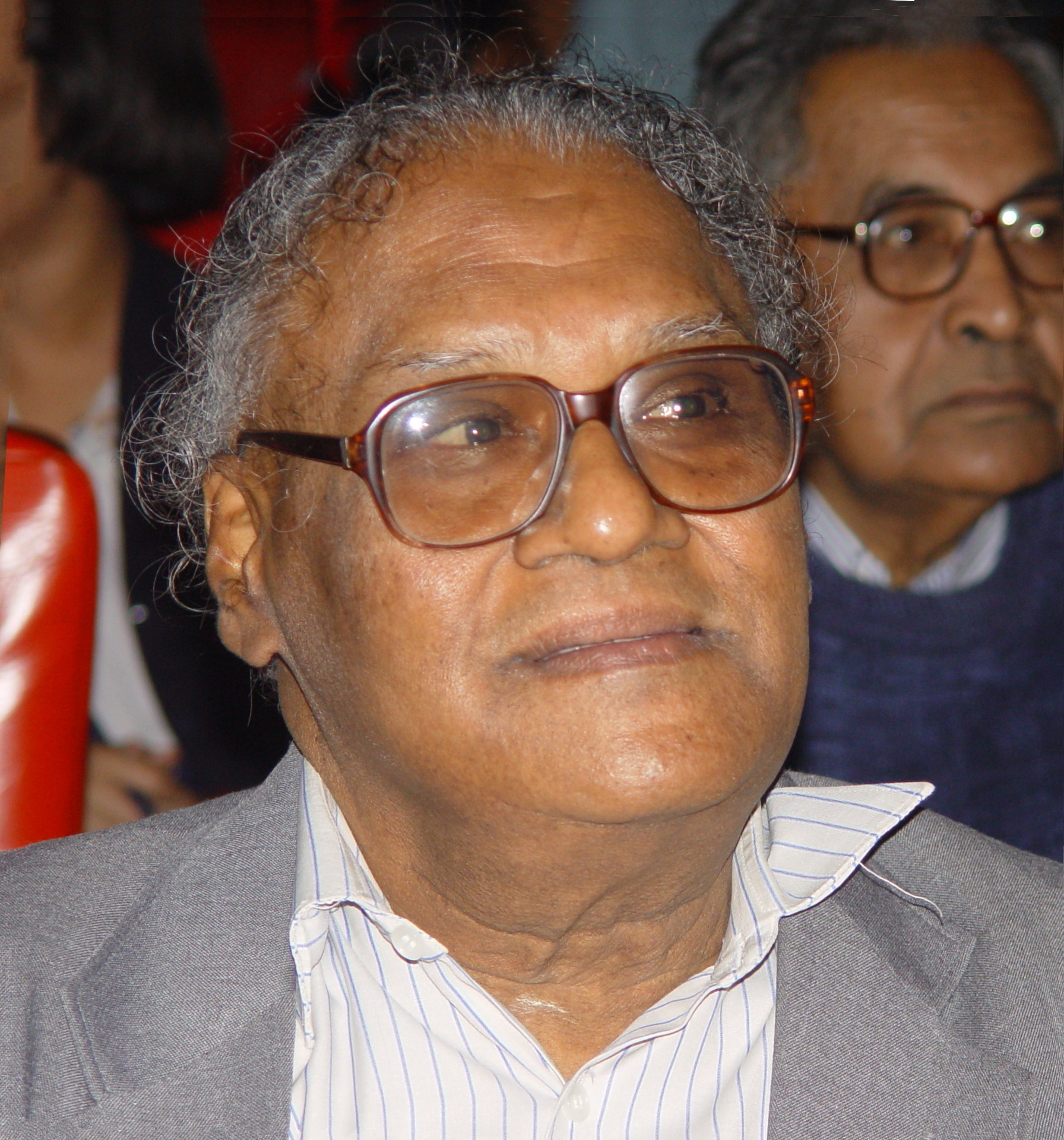
- Professor Rao in 2013
- Born: Chintamani Nagesa Ramachandra Rao; 30 June 1934 (age 92); Bangalore, Kingdom of Mysore, British India
- Education: Mysore University (BS); Banaras Hindu University (MS); Purdue University (PhD)
- Awards: Bharat Ratna (2014); Padma Vibhushan (1985); Padma Shri (1974); Marlow Medal (1967); Shanti Swarup Bhatnagar Prize for Science and Technology (1969); Hughes Medal (2000); India Science Award (2004); Dan David Prize (2005); Legion of Honor (2005); Abdus Salam Medal (2008); Royal Medal (2009); Karnataka Ratna (2001); Order of Friendship (2009); National Order of Scientific Merit (2012); Order of the Rising Sun (2015); Von Hippel Award (2017); ENI award (2020)
- Scientific career
- Fields: Solid-state chemistry
- Workplaces: Indian Space Research Organisation; IIT Kanpur; Indian Institute of Science; University of Oxford; University of Cambridge; University of California, Santa Barbara; Jawaharlal Nehru Centre for Advanced Scientific Research
- Website: www.jncasr.ac.in/cnrrao/index.html

Chintamani Nagesa Ramachandra Rao (born 30 June 1934) is an Indian chemist who has worked mainly in solid-state and structural chemistry. He has honorary doctorates from 88 universities from around the world and has authored over 1,800 research publications and 58 books. He is described as a scientist who had won all possible awards in his field except the Nobel Prize.

Rao completed his BSc from Mysore University at age seventeen, and his MSc from Banaras Hindu University at age nineteen. He earned a PhD from Purdue University at the age of twenty-four. He was the youngest lecturer when he joined the Indian Institute of Science in 1959. After transferring to the Indian Institute of Technology Kanpur, he returned to IISc, eventually becoming its director from 1984 to 1994. He was chair of the Scientific Advisory Council to the Prime Minister of India from 1985 to 1989 and from 2005 to 2014. He founded and works in Jawaharlal Nehru Centre for Advanced Scientific Research and International Centre for Materials Science.

Rao received scientific awards and honours including the Marlow Medal, Shanti Swarup Bhatnagar Prize for Science and Technology, Hughes Medal, India Science Award, Dan David Prize, Royal Medal, Von Hippel Award, and ENI award. He also received Padma Shri and Padma Vibhushan from the Government of India. On 16 November 2013, the Government of India selected him for Bharat Ratna, the highest civilian award in India, making him the third scientist after C.V. Raman and A. P. J. Abdul Kalam to receive the award. He received the award on 4 February 2014 from President Pranab Mukherjee at the Rashtrapati Bhavan.

== Early life and education ==
C.N.R. Rao was born in a Kannada Deshastha Brahmin family in Bangalore to Hanumantha Nagesa Rao and Nagamma Nagesa Rao. His father was an Inspector of Schools. He was an only child, and his learned parents made an academic environment. He was well versed in Hindu literature from his mother and in English from his father at an early age. He did not attend elementary school but was home-tutored by his mother, who was particularly skilled in arithmetic and Hindu literature. He entered middle school in 1940, at age six. Although he was the youngest in his class, he used to tutor his classmates in mathematics and English. He passed the lower secondary examination (class VII) in the first class in 1944. He was ten years old, and his father rewarded him with four annas (twenty-five paisa). He attended Acharya Patashala high school in Basavanagudi, which made a lasting influence on his interest in chemistry. His father enrolled him to a Kannada-medium course to encourage his mother tongue, but at home used English for all conversation. He completed secondary school leaving certificate in first class in 1947. He studied BSc at Central College, Bangalore where he developed communication skills in English and also learned Sanskrit.

He obtained his bachelor's degree from Mysore University in 1951, in first class, at the age of seventeen. He initially thought of joining Indian Institute of Science (IISc) for a diploma or a postgraduate degree in chemical engineering, but a teacher persuaded him to attend Banaras Hindu University. He obtained a master's in chemistry from BHU two years later.

In 1953, he was granted a scholarship for PhD in Indian Institute of Technology Kharagpur. But four foreign universities, MIT, Penn State, Columbia and Purdue also offered him financial support. He chose Purdue. His first research paper was published in the Agra University Journal of Research in 1954. He completed PhD in 1958, after only two years and nine months.

== Career ==
After completion of his graduate studies, Rao returned to Bangalore in 1959 to take up a lecturing position, joining IISc and embarking on an independent research program. The facility at the time was so meagre that he described it, saying, "You would get string and sealing wax and that's about it." In 1963 he accepted a permanent position in the Department of Chemistry at the Indian Institute of Technology Kanpur. He was elected Fellow of the Indian Academy of Sciences in 1964. He returned to IISc in 1976 to establish a solid state and structural chemistry unit. and became director of the IISc from 1984 to 1994. At various points in his career Rao has taken appointments as a visiting professor at Purdue University, the University of Oxford, the University of Cambridge and University of California, Santa Barbara. He was the Jawaharlal Nehru Professor at the University of Cambridge and Professorial Fellow at the King's College, Cambridge during 1983–1984.

Rao has been working as the National Research Professor holding the positions Linus Pauling Research Professor and Honorary President of Jawaharlal Nehru Centre for Advanced Scientific Research, Bangalore, which he founded in 1989. He had served as chair of the Scientific Advisory Council to the Indian Prime Minister for two terms, from 1985 to 1989 and from 2005 to 2014. He is also the director of the International Centre for Materials Science (ICMS), which he founded in 2010, and serves on the board of the Science Initiative Group.

== Scientific contribution ==
Rao is one of the world's foremost solid state and materials chemists. He has contributed to the development of the field over five decades. His work on transition metal oxides has led to basic understanding of novel phenomena and the relationship between materials properties and the structural chemistry of these materials.

Rao was one of the earliest to synthesise two-dimensional oxide materials such as La_{2}CuO_{4}. He was one of the first to synthesise 123 cuprates, the first liquid nitrogen-temperature superconductor in 1987. He was also the first to synthesis Y junction carbon nanotubes in the mid-1990s. His work has led to a systematic study of compositionally controlled metal-insulator transitions. Such studies have had a profound impact in application fields such as colossal magneto resistance and high temperature superconductivity. Oxide semiconductors have unusual promise. He has made immense contributions to nanomaterials over the last two decades, besides his work on hybrid materials.

He shares co-authorship of more than 1800 research papers and has co-authored or edited more than 58 books.

== Awards and recognition ==
=== Fellowships and memberships of academic societies ===
- Fellow of the Indian Academy of Sciences (FASc, 1965)
- Fellow of the Indian National Science Academy (FNA, 1974)
- Fellow of the Royal Society (FRS, 1982)
- Founding Fellow of The World Academy of Sciences (FTWAS, 1983)
- Honorary Fellow of the Royal Society of Chemistry (Hon. FRSC, 1989)
- Foreign Member of the Academia Europaea (MAE, 1997)
- Honorary Fellow of the Institute of Physics (Hon.FInstP, 2007)
- Member of many of the world's scientific associations, including the National Academy of Sciences, American Academy of Arts and Sciences, Royal Society of Canada, French Academy, Japanese Academy, Serbian Academy of Sciences and Arts and Polish Academy of Sciences, Czechoslovak Academy of Sciences, Serbian Academy of Sciences, Slovenian Academy of Sciences, Brazilian Academy of Sciences, Spanish Royal Academy of Sciences, National Academy of Sciences of Korea, African Academy of Sciences, and the American Philosophical Society. He is also a member of the Pontifical Academy.

=== Honorary doctorates ===
International:

Professor C.N.R. Rao has received numerous honorary degrees from universities worldwide in recognition of his contributions to science. In Africa, he was awarded a D.Sc. Honoris Causa by Stellenbosch University, South Africa, in 2007. Australia honored him with a D.Sc. Honoris Causa from the Australian National University in Canberra in 2015. In the United Kingdom, he received honorary degrees from the University of Wales (Cardiff), Liverpool, Oxford (2007), and St. Andrews University (2013).

In France, he was awarded Honoris Causa doctorates by the University of Bordeaux in 1983, the University of Caen in 2000, and Université Joseph Fourier in Grenoble in 2011. Other recognitions include a D.Sc. Honoris Causa from Wroclaw University in Poland (1989) and from Novosibirsk University and the Russian Academy of Sciences (Siberian Branch) in Russia (1999). Additionally, Sweden awarded him an Honoris Causa Doctorate from Uppsala University in 2000, and Sudan awarded a D.Sc. Honoris Causa from the University of Khartoum in 2002.

In the United States, he has received honorary doctorates from several universities, including Colorado, Northwestern, Notre Dame, Purdue, Temple, and others.

National

In India, Professor Rao's contributions have been acknowledged by a wide range of institutions. He has received honorary doctorates from major universities, including Aligarh University, Banaras Hindu University, Bangalore University, Calcutta University, Delhi University, Hyderabad University, Jawaharlal Nehru Technological University, Kanpur University, Mangalore University, Panjab University, and Roorkee University. Additionally, he has been honored by Visvesvaraya Technological University, Indian Institutes of Technology (IITs) at Bombay, Kharagpur, Kanpur, New Delhi, and Guwahati, and the Indian Institutes of Science Education and Research (IISERs) in Bhopal, Kolkata, Mohali, and Pune. Notable recognitions also include an LL.D. (Honoris Causa) from Sri Venkateswara University, a D.Litt. from Guwahati University, the "Desikottama" award from Visva-Bharati University and The Assam Royal Global University, Guwahati 2022.

=== Major scientific awards ===
- 1967: Marlow Medal by the Faraday Society of England
- 1968: Shanti Swarup Bhatnagar Prize for Science and Technology in Chemical Science
- 2000: Centenary Medal of the Royal Society of Chemistry, London
- 2000: Hughes Medal by the Royal Society
- 2004: India Science Award
- 2005: Dan David Prize from Tel Aviv University shared with George Whitesides and Robert Langer.
- 2008: Abdus Salam Medal by The World Academy of Sciences (TWAS)
- 2009: Royal Medal by the Royal Society
- 2010: August-Wilhelm-von-Hofmann Medal by the German Chemical Society
- 2017: The Von Hippel Award by the Materials Research Society
- 2021: International ENI award 2020 for research in renewable energy sources and energy storage, also called the Energy Frontier award

=== Scientific awards ===
- 1961: DSc from Mysore University.
- 1973: Yedanapalli Medal and Prize
- 1975: C. V. Raman Award in Physical Science by the University Grants Commission of India
- 1980: S. N. Bose Medal by the Indian National Science Academy
- 1981: Royal Society of Chemistry (London) Medal
- 1981: Founding member of the World Cultural Council
- 1989: Heyrovsky Gold Medal of the Czechoslovak Academy of Sciences
- 1990: Meghnath Saha Medal of the Indian National Science Academy
- 1996: Einstein Gold Medal of UNESCO
- 2004: Doctor of Science from University of Calcutta.
- 2004: Somiya Award of the International Union of Materials Research.
- 2008: Nikkei Asia Prize for Science, Technology and Innovation, by Nihon Keizai Shimbun, Inc., Japan.
- 2008: Khwarizmi International Award 2008 for Innovation along with Ajayan Vinu
- 2011: Ernesto Illy Trieste Science Prize for materials research
- 2013: 2012 Award for International Scientific Cooperation from the Chinese Academy of Sciences
- 2013: Elected honorary foreign member of Chinese Academy of Sciences
- 2013: Distinguished Academician Award from IIT Patna
- 2016: Asian Scientist 100, Asian Scientist
- 2018: Platinum Medal from Indian Association of Nanoscience and Nanotechnology
- 2019: The first Sheikh Saud International Prize for Materials Research from the Center for Advanced Materials of the United Arab Emirates
- 2020: ENI award for Energy Frontiers
- Foreign fellow of Bangladesh Academy of Sciences

=== Indian governmental honours ===
- 1974 – Padma Shri, India's fourth-highest civilian award.
- Padma Vibhushan in 1985
- Karnataka Ratna by the Karnataka State Government in 2000
- Bharat Ratna in 2014

=== Foreign honours ===
- Brazil: Great Cross of the National Order of Scientific Merit (2002)
- France: Chevalier de la Légion d'honneur (2005)
- Japan: Gold and Silver Star of the Order of the Rising Sun (2015)
- Russia: Order of Friendship (2009)

=== Legacy ===
- Rao with his wife established the CNR Rao Education Foundation using the Dan David Prize money. The foundation is based in Jawaharlal Nehru Centre for Advanced Scientific Research and offers Best Science Teacher Award to pre-university and high school science teachers.
- Rao established the International Centre for Materials Science (ICMS) which offers the C N R Rao Prize Lecture in Advanced Materials since 2010.
- The World Academy of Sciences instituted the TWAS-C.N.R. Rao Award for Scientific Research since 2006 for scientists in the least developed countries.
- The Shanmugha Arts, Science, Technology & Research Academy has created the SASTRA-CNR Rao Award for Chemistry and Material Science in 2014.

== Personal life ==
Rao is married to Indumati Rao since 1960. They have two children, Sanjay and Suchitra. Sanjay works as a science populariser in schools around Bangalore. Suchitra is married to Krishna N. Ganesh, the director of the Indian Institute of Science Education and Research (IISER) at Pune, Maharashtra. Rao is technophobic and he never checks his email by himself. He also said that he uses the mobile phone only to talk to his wife.

== Controversies ==
In 1987, Rao and his team published a series of four papers, of which three were in the Proceedings of the Indian Academy of Sciences (Chemical Science), Pramana, and Current Science, all published by the Indian Academy of Sciences. A report was submitted to the Society for Scientific Values that the three papers had no mention of the dates of receipt, which were normally explicitly mentioned in those journals. Upon inquiry, it was found that the paper manuscripts were actually received after the date of publication, indicating that they were backdated. The society declared the case as "Use of Wrong Means to Claim Priority."

Rao has been subject of allegations on plagiarism. In 2011, Rao's research team at the Indian Institute of Science (IISc) published a paper in the journal Advanced Materials which the journal editors later found to contain sentences copied verbatim in the introduction and methodology from a paper published in Applied Physics Letters in 2010. An review in Nature reported that a student wrote the text. The authors apologized in the same journal. Rao said that he did read the manuscript and that it was an oversight on his part as he focused mainly on the results and discussion.

Other scientists reviewing the research agreed that the plagiarised portion had no bearing on the findings. Rao described the content as copying text, but not plagiarism. Still, as senior scientist and corresponding author, Rao took responsibility for the error.

More allegations of instances of plagiarism in articles co-authored Rao have been reported. Rao's paper in 2010 about the effect of nanoparticles on solar cells in Applied Physics Express contains texts that are very similar to those of a paper by Matheu et al. from Applied Physics Letters in 2008. An article in the Journal of Luminescence in 2011, contains 20 unattributed lines which appear to be copied from articles in Nanotechnology and Advanced Materials, while a few lines of Rao's article in Nanotechnology were found to be copied from Applied Physics Letters. Rao had stated, referring to the 2011 incident, that he had never before stolen an idea without giving credit.

Rao was given a Bharat Ratna by the Government of India in spite of the controversy and was active as a professor at Jawaharlal Nehru Centre for Advanced Scientific Research (JNCASR). In December 2013, a student group filed a public interest litigation in Allahabad High Court, Lucknow Bench, to challenge Rao's Bharat Ratna. They asserted that "a scientist with proven cases of plagiarism shall not be presented the highest civilian award." But the court ruled them out as "filing pleas for publicity." There was another plea to revoke the award in 2015, but the Central Information Commission dismissed the petition.

On 17 November 2013, at a press conference following the announcement of his Bharat Ratna, Rao called the Indian politicians "idiots" which caused a national outrage. He said, "Why the hell have these idiots [politicians] given so little to us despite what we have done? For the money that the government has given us we [scientists] have done much more." In his defence Rao insisted that he merely talked about the "idiotic" way the politicians ignore investments for research funding in science.
