= Peter Friz =

Austrian mathematician

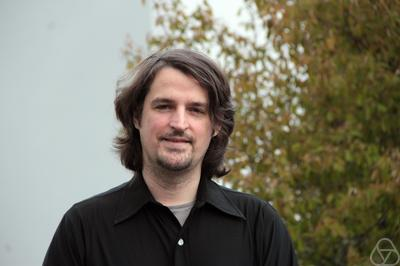
- Friz at Oberwolfach in 2016
- Born: 20 April 1974 (age 52); Klagenfurt
- Education: New York University (2004, PhD in Mathematics); University of Cambridge (2000, Certificate of Advanced Studies in Mathematics); TU Wien, École Centrale Paris (1999, Double degree in Math. and Engineering)
- Known for: Stochastic analysis; Rough path
- Scientific career
- Fields: Mathematics
- Workplaces: Technische Universität Berlin; Weierstrass Institute; University of Cambridge
- Doctoral advisor: S. R. Srinivasa Varadhan

Peter K. Friz (born 1974 in Klagenfurt) is a mathematician working in the fields of partial differential equations, quantitative finance, and stochastic analysis.

== Education and career ==
He studied at the Vienna University of Technology, Ecole Centrale Paris, University of Cambridge and Courant Institute of Mathematical Sciences (New York University), and obtained his PhD in 2004 under the supervision of S. R. Srinivasa Varadhan.

He worked as a quantitative associate at Merrill Lynch, then held academic positions at the University of Cambridge, and the Radon Institute. Since 2009, he is full professor at Technische Universität Berlin, and associated with the Weierstrass Institute for Applied Analysis and Stochastics in Berlin.

In 2010 he has been awarded an ERC Starting Grant. In 2016 he has been awarded an ERC Consolidator Grant.

== Books ==
- with Hairer, Martin (2020). A Course on Rough Paths. Universitext (2nd ed.). Springer Cham. doi:10.1007/978-3-030-41556-3. ISBN 978-3-030-41555-6.
- with König, Wolfgang; Mukherjee, Chiranjib; Olla, Stefano, eds. (2019). Probability and Analysis in Interacting Physical Systems. Springer Proceedings in Mathematics & Statistics. Vol. 283. Springer Cham. doi:10.1007/978-3-030-15338-0. ISBN 978-3-030-15337-3. S2CID 239327881.
- with Victoir, Nicolas (2010). Multidimensional Stochastic Processes as Rough Paths. Cambridge University Press. doi:10.1017/CBO9780511845079. ISBN 978-0-521-87607-0.
