= Ashok Varadhan =

American financial executive

Ashok Varadhan (born in 1972) is an American investor currently serving as the co-head of global banking and markets at Goldman Sachs. Varadhan was previously co-head of global markets, the firm's securities division, from 2014 to 2018.

== Early life ==
He is the son of mathematician S. R. Srinivasa Varadhan. He graduated from Duke University with a double-major in mathematics and economics.

== Career ==
He briefly worked at Merrill Lynch after graduation, on their swaps trading desk, eventually becoming a vice-president at the firm. He later joined and then became a partner at Goldman Sachs at age 29 – one of the youngest ever – after joining the firm as an associate only four years earlier. In the 2000s, his derivatives-trading desk earned billions of dollars for the firm. In 2015 he was transferred from New York to the London office. He was briefly sole head of the securities division in 2018, during a leadership reshuffle. He is considered a protégé of former CEO Lloyd Blankfein.

== Personal life ==
He has lived in New York City for most of his life. He has five children. He is married to Alyssa Varadhan.
