= C. R. Rao =

Indian-American mathematician (1920–2023)

C. R. Rao FRS
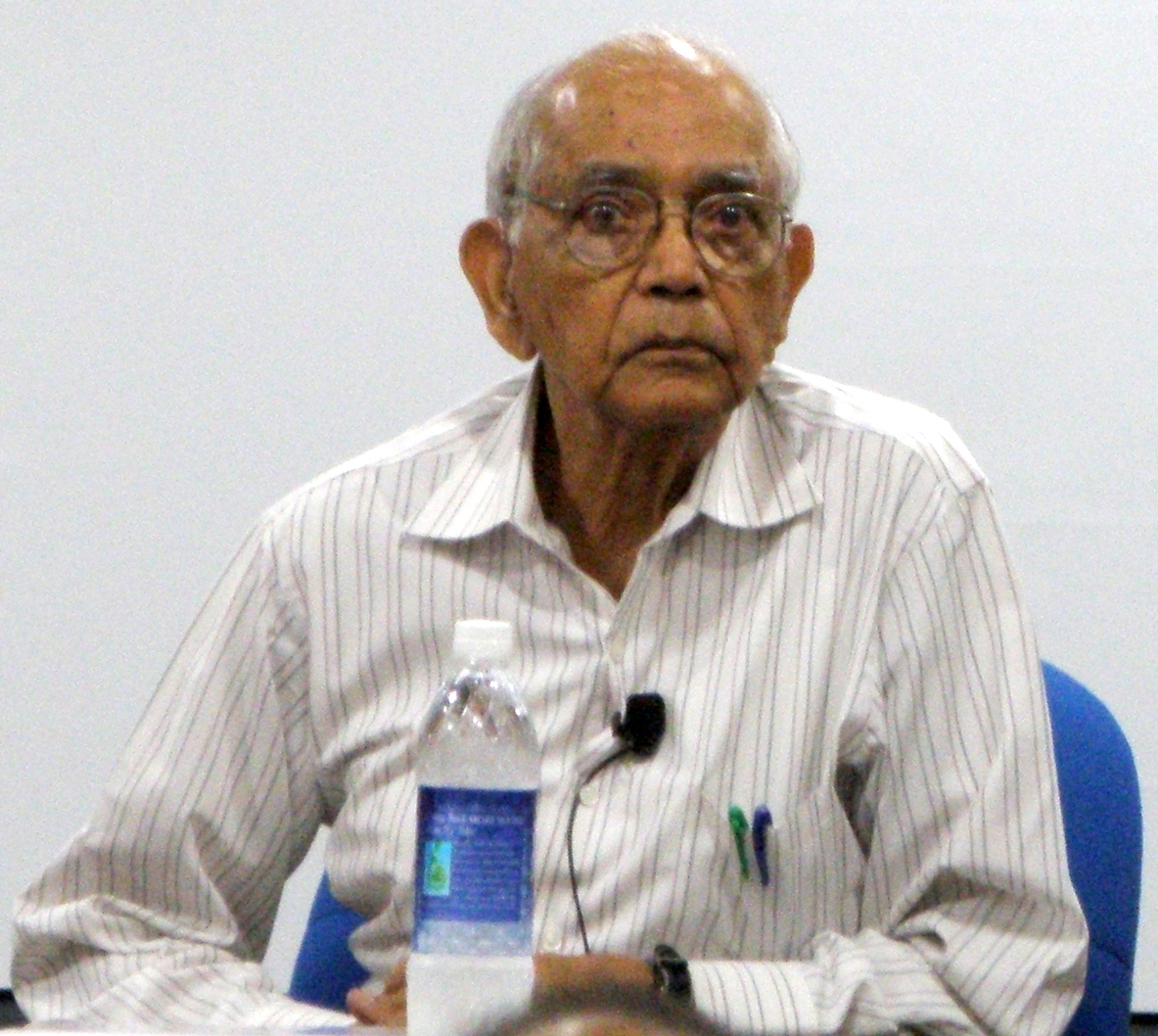
- Rao in 2012
- Born: Calyampudi Radhakrishna Rao; 10 September 1920; Hoovina Hadagali, Madras Presidency, British India
- Died: 22 August 2023 (aged 102); Buffalo, New York, U.S.
- Citizenship: Indian (until 1995); American (1995–2023)
- Education: Andhra University (MA); University of Calcutta (MA); King's College, Cambridge (PhD, DSc)
- Known for: Multivariate statistical theory Cramér–Rao bound Rao–Blackwell theorem Orthogonal arrays Score test
- Awards: Padma Bhushan (1968); Padma Vibhushan (2001); National Medal of Science (2001); S. S. Bhatnagar Prize (1963); Guy Medal (Silver 1965, Gold 2011); International Prize in Statistics (2023)
- Scientific career
- Fields: Mathematics and Statistics
- Workplaces: Indian Statistical Institute; Cambridge University; Pennsylvania State University; University at Buffalo
- Thesis: Statistical Problems of Biological Classifications (1948)
- Doctoral advisor: Ronald Fisher
- Doctoral students: S. R. Srinivasa Varadhan K. R. Parthasarathy Veeravalli S. Varadarajan R. Ranga Rao Debabrata Basu Radha Laha Ravindra Khattree Thiruvenkatachari Parthasarathy Dabeeru C. Rao Sreenivasa Rao Jammalamadaka U. S. R. Murty

Prof. Calyampudi Radhakrishna Rao FRS (10 September 1920 – 22 August 2023) was an Indian-American mathematician and statistician. He was professor emeritus at Pennsylvania State University and research professor at the University at Buffalo. Rao was honoured by numerous colloquia, honorary degrees, and festschrifts and was awarded the US National Medal of Science in 2002. The American Statistical Association has described him as "a living legend" whose work has influenced not just statistics, but has had far reaching implications for fields as varied as economics, genetics, anthropology, geology, national planning, demography, biometry, and medicine." The Times of India listed Rao as one of the top 10 Indian scientists of all time.

In 2023, Rao was awarded the International Prize in Statistics, an award often touted as the "statistics' equivalent of the Nobel Prize". Rao was also a Senior Policy and Statistics advisor for the Indian Heart Association non-profit focused on raising South Asian cardiovascular disease awareness.

== Early life ==
C. R. Rao was the eighth of the ten children born to a Telugu family in Hoovina Hadagali, Bellary, Madras Presidency, Britain ruled India (now in Vijayanagara, Karnataka, India). His schooling was completed in Gudur, Nuzvid, Nandigama, and Visakhapatnam, all in the present state of Andhra Pradesh. He received an MSc in mathematics from Andhra University and an MA in statistics from Calcutta University in 1943. He obtained a PhD degree at King's College, Cambridge, under R. A. Fisher in 1948, to which he added a DSc degree, also from Cambridge, in 1965.

== Career ==
Rao first worked at the Indian Statistical Institute and the Anthropological Museum in Cambridge. Later he held several important positions, as the Director of the Indian Statistical Institute, Jawaharlal Nehru Professor and National Professor in India, University Professor at the University of Pittsburgh and Eberly Professor and Chair of Statistics and Director of the Center for Multivariate Analysis at Pennsylvania State University.

As Head and later Director of the Research and Training School at the Indian Statistical Institute, India for a period of over 40 years, Rao developed research and training programs and produced several leaders in the field of Mathematics. On the basis of Rao's recommendation, the Asian Statistical Institute (ASI), now known as the Statistical Institute for Asia and Pacific, was established in Tokyo to provide training to statisticians working in government and industrial organisations.

Among his best-known discoveries are the Multivariate Analysis of Variance (MANOVA), Rao Distance, Rao's Score test, Rao's Quadratic Entropy, Cramér–Rao bound and the Rao–Blackwell theorem these are related to the quality of estimators. Majority of the publications were during his time period in Indian Statistical Institute in 60 years of his career. Other areas he worked in include multivariate analysis, estimation theory, and differential geometry. His other contributions include the Fisher–Rao theorem, Rao distance, and orthogonal arrays. He was the author of 15 books and authored over 400 journal publications.

Rao received 38 honorary doctoral degrees from universities in 19 countries around the world and numerous awards and medals for his contributions to statistics and science. He was a member of eight National Academies in India, the United Kingdom, the United States, and Italy. Rao was awarded Santhi Swarup Bhatnagar Award in 1963 and followed by Padma Bhushan in 1968. Rao was awarded the United States National Medal of Science, that nation's highest award for lifetime achievement in fields of scientific research, in June 2002. He was given the India Science Award in 2010, the highest honour conferred by the government of India in a scientific domain. He was most recently honoured with his 38th honorary doctorate by the Indian Institute of Technology, Kharagpur, on 26 July 2014 for "his contributions to the foundations of modern statistics through the introduction of concepts such as Cramér–Rao inequality, Rao–Blackwellization, Rao distance, Rao measure, and for introducing the idea of orthogonal arrays for the industry to design high-quality products."

Rao was the President of the International Statistical Institute, Institute of Mathematical Statistics (USA), and the International Biometric Society. He was inducted into the Hall of Fame of India's National Institution for Quality and Reliability (Chennai Branch) for his contribution to industrial statistics and the promotion of quality control programs in industries.

The Journal of Quantitative Economics published a special issue in Rao's honour in 1991: "Dr. Rao is a very distinguished scientist and a highly eminent statistician of our time. His contributions to statistical theory and applications are well known, and many of his results, which bear his name, are included in the curriculum of courses in statistics at bachelor's and master's level all over the world. He was an inspiring teacher and has guided the research work of numerous students in all areas of statistics. His early work had greatly influenced the course of statistical research during the last four decades. One of the purposes of this special issue is to recognise Dr. Rao's own contributions to econometrics and acknowledge his major role in the development of econometric research in India."

=== Areas of research contributions ===
- Estimation theory
- Statistical inference and linear models
- Multivariate analysis
- Combinatorial design
- Orthogonal arrays
- Biometry
- Statistical genetics
- Generalized matrix inverses
- Functional equations

== Death ==
Rao died in Buffalo, New York on 22 August 2023, aged 102.

== Awards and medals ==
- Guy Medal in Gold (2011) of the Royal Statistical Society
- India Science Award 2010 (the highest award in a scientific field presented by government of India)
- International Mahalanobis Prize (2003) of the International Statistical Institute
- Srinivasa Ramanujan Medal (2003) of the Indian National Science Academy
- Sardar Patel Lifetime Achievement International Award (Sardar Ratna) (2014) by Sardar Patel International Foundation, India
- President George W. Bush, on 12 June 2002, honoured him with the National Medal of Science, the highest award in US in the scientific field, as a "prophet of new age" with the citation, "for his pioneering contributions to the foundations of statistical theory and multivariate statistical methodology and their applications, enriching the physical, biological, mathematical, economic and engineering sciences."
- Padma Vibhushan (2001) by the Government of India
- Mahalanobis Centenary Gold Medal (1993?) of the Indian Science Congress
- Wilks Memorial Award (1989) of the American Statistical Association
- Padma Bhushan (1968)
- Megnadh Saha Medal (1969) of the Indian National Science Academy
- Guy Medal in Silver (1965) of the Royal Statistical Society
- S. S. Bhatnagar Award (1963) of Council of Scientific and Industrial Research
- JC Bose Gold Medal of the Bose Institute
- Gold Medal of the University of Calcutta
- He was also awarded an honorary Doctor of Science by the University of Calcutta in 2003. Also honorary doctorates from a number of universities and institutes around the world.
- 2023 International Prize in Statistics

=== In his honour ===
- The Pennsylvania State University has established C. R. and Bhargavi Rao Prize in Statistics
- CR Rao Advanced Institute of Mathematics, Statistics and Computer Science
- National Award in Statistics established by Ministry of Statistics and Programme Implementation (MoSPI), Government of India.
- The road from IIIT Hyderabad passing along Central University of Hyderabad crossroads to Alind Factory, Lingampally is named as "Prof. C.R. Rao Road".

== Selected publications ==
=== Books ===
- 2020. PEREIRA, B. de B.; RAO, Calyampudi Radhakrishna.; OLIVEIRA, F. B.;Statistical Learning Using Neural Networks: A Guide for Statisticians and Data Scientists with Python, CRC Press, London.
- 2017. Book Review: Multivariate Statistical Methods, A Primer
- 2016. (with Lovric, M.) Testing Point Null Hypothesis of a Normal Mean and the Truth: 21st Century Perspective
- 2009. (with PEREIRA, B. de B.) Data Mining Using Neural Networks: A Guide for Statisticians. State College, Pennsylvania, 2009. 186 p.
- 1999. (with Helge Toutenburg, Andreas Fieger et al.). Linear Models: Least Squares and Alternatives, 2ed, Springer Series in Statistics. Springer
- 1998. (with M. Bhaskara Rao). Matrix Algebra & Its Applications to Statistics & Econometrics. World Scientific
- 1997. Statistics And Truth: Putting Chance To Work, 2ed. Wspc
- 1996. Principal Component and Factor Analyses. PN
- 1996. Extensions of a Characterization of an Exponential Distribution Based on a Censored Ordered Sample.
- 1996. Bootstrap by Sequential Resampling. PN
- 1993. Applications of Multivariate Analysis. PN
- 1992. Signal Estimation, Multitarget Tracking and Related Areas.
- 1989. Multivariate Analysis and Its Applications. PN
- 1988. Linear Transformations, Projection Operators and Generalized Inverses; A Geometric Approach. PN
- 1984. Recent Results on Characterization of Probability Distributions: A unified Approach through Extensions of Deny's Theorem. PN
- 1973. Linear Statistical Inference and Its Applications, 2nd Edition. Wiley-Interscience
- 1973. On a Unified Theory of Estimation in Linear Models. PN
- 1973. (with A.M. Kagan et al.). Characterization Problems in Mathematical Statistics, Wiley Series in Probability & Mathematical Statistics.
- 1972. (with Sujit Kumar Mitra). Generalized Inverse of Matrices and Its Applications, Probability & Mathematical Statistics. John Wiley & Sons
- 1963. Essays on econometrics and planning. Statistical Pub. Society

=== Edited volumes ===
- 2015. (Ed. with Marepalli B. Rao). Handbook of Statistics 32: Computational Statistics with. Elsevier
- 2013. (Ed. with Venu Govindaraju). Handbook of Statistics 31: Machine Learning: Theory and Applications. North Holland
- 2012. (Ed. with Tata Subba Rao and Suhasini Subba Rao). Handbook of Statistics 30: Time Series Analysis: Methods and Applications . North Holland
- 2012. (Ed. with Ranajit Chakraborty and Pranab K. Sen). Handbook of Statistics 28: Bioinformatics in Human Health and Heredity. North Holland
- 2011. (Ed. with Dipak K. Dey). Essential Bayesian Models. North Holland
- 2011. (Ed. with Danny Pfeffermann). Essential Methods for Design Based Sample Surveys. North Holland
- 2009. (Ed. with Danny Pfeffermann). Handbook of Statistics 29A: Sample Surveys: Design, Methods and Applications. North Holland
- 2009. (Ed. with Danny Pfeffermann). Handbook of statistics 29B Sample Surveys: Inference and Analysis. North Holland
- 2007. (Ed. with J. Philip Miller and D.C. Rao). Handbook of Statistics 27: Epidemiology and Medical Statistics. North Holland
- 2006. (Ed. with Sandip Sinharay). Handbook of Statistics, Volume 26: Psychometrics. North Holland
- 2005. (Ed. with Dipak K. Dey). Handbook of Statistics 25: Bayesian Thinking, Modeling and Computation. North Holland
- 2005. (Ed.). Handbook of Statistics 24: Data Mining and Data Visualization. North Holland
- 2004. (Ed. with N. Balakrishnan). Handbook of Statistics 23: Advances in Survival Analysis. North Holland
- 2003. (Ed. with Ravindra Khattree). Handbook of Statistics 22: Statistics in Industry. North Holland
- 2001. (Ed. with N. Balakrishnan). Handbook of Statistics 20: Advances in Reliability, North-Holland Mathematics Studies. Elsevier
- 2001. (Ed. with D. N. Shanbhag). Handbook of Statistics 19: Stochastic Processes: Theory and Methods. North-Holland
- 2000. (Ed. with Pranab Kumar Sen). Handbook of Statistics 18: Bioenvironmental and Public Health Statistics. North-Holland
- 1998. (Ed. with N. Balakrishnan). Handbook of Statistics 17: Order Statistics: Applications. North-Holland
- 1998. (Ed. with N. Balakrishnan). Handbook of Statistics 16: Order Statistics: Theory & Methods. North-Holland
- 1997. (Ed. with G.S. Maddala). Handbook of Statistics 15: Robust Inference. Elsevier
- 1996. (Ed. with G.S. Maddala). Handbook of Statistics 14: Statistical Methods in Finance. Elsevier
- 1996. (Ed. with S. Ghosh). Handbook of Statistics 13: Design and Analysis of Experiments. North Holland
- 1994. (Ed. with G.P. Patil). Handbook of Statistics 12: Environmental Statistics. Elsevier
- 1994. (Ed. with G.P. Patil). Multivariate Environmental Statistics., Volume 6 in North-Holland Series in Statistics and Probability. North Holland
- 1993. (Ed. with G. S. Maddala and H. D. Vinod). Handbook of Statistics 11: Econometrics, Techniques and Instrumentation in Analytical Chemistry. Elsevier
- 1993. (Ed. with N. K. Bose). Handbook of Statistics 10: Signal Processing and its Applications, Elsevier
- 1993. (Ed.). Handbook of Statistics 9: Computational Statistics. North-Holland
- 1991. (Ed. with R. Chakraborty). Handbook of Statistics 8: Statistical Methods in Biological and Medical Sciences. North-Holland.
- 1988. (Ed. with Krishnaiah P.R.). Handbook of Statistics 7: Quality Control and Reliability.
- 1988. (Ed. with P. R. Krishnaiah). Handbook of Statistics 6: Sampling. North-Holland.
- 1969. (Ed. with R. C. Bose, I. M. Chakravarti et al.). Essays in Probability and Statistics, Monograph Series in Probability and Statistics. The University of North Carolina Press

=== Textbooks ===
- 1970. Advanced Statistical Methods in Biometric Research. Macmillan

=== Collected works ===
- 1996. Selected Papers of C.R. Rao 3. (Ed). S. Das Gupta et al. Wiley-Interscience
- 1995. Advances in Econometrics and Quantitative Economics, Essays in Honor of Professor C.R. Rao. (Eds.) G. S. Maddala, T. N. Srinivasan, and Peter C. B. Phillips. Wiley-Blackwell
- 1994. Selected Papers of C.R. Rao 2. (Ed). S. Das Gupta et al. Wiley-Interscience
- 1994. Selected Papers of C.R. Rao 1. (Ed). S. Das Gupta et al. Wiley-Interscience
- 1982. Statistics and Probability: Essays in Honor of C. R. Rao. (Ed.). Kallinapur. Elsevier

== Sources ==
- Calyampudi Radhakrishnan Rao. University of Minnesota Morris
- Statisticians in History: Calyampudi R. Rao". American Statistical Association
- "Prof. C R Rao : An Eminent Statistician" By Bibhuprasad Mohapatra. Govt. of Odisha.
