= R. L. Hudson =

British mathematician

Robin Hudson
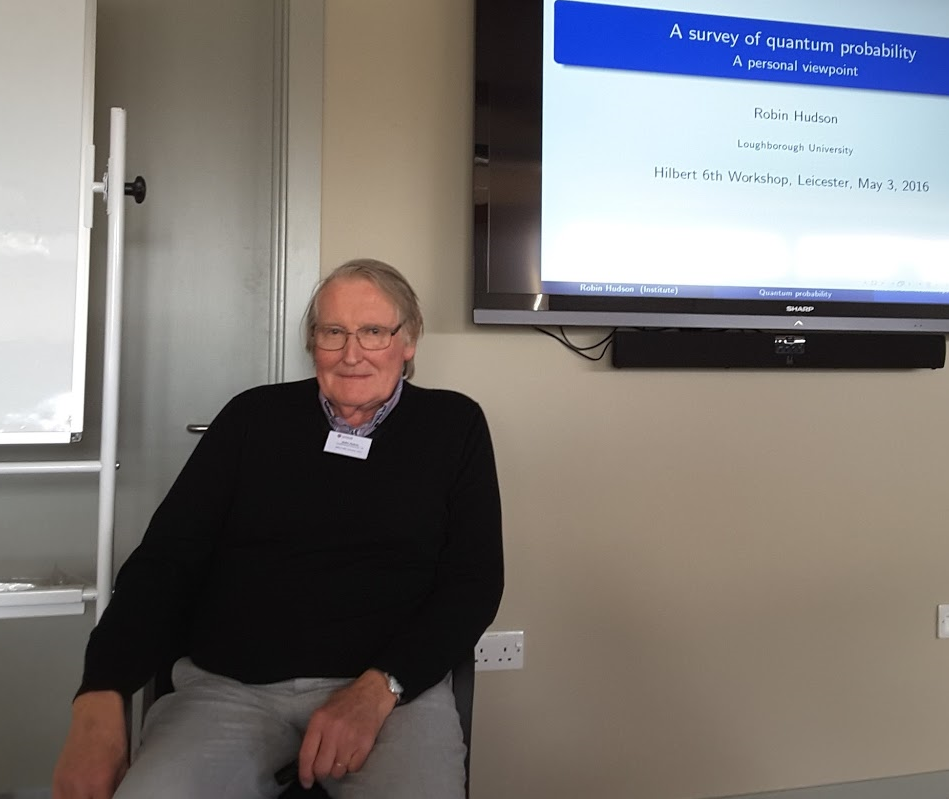
- A plenary talk at the EPSRC-LMS-IMA conference 'Hilbert's sixth problem' in Leicester, May 3, 2016
- Born: 4 May 1940
- Died: 12 January 2021 (aged 80)
- Education: University of Oxford
- Scientific career
- Fields: Mathematics
- Workplaces: University of Nottingham, Loughborough University
- Doctoral advisor: John Trevor Lewis

Robin Lyth Hudson (4 May 1940 – 12 January 2021) was a British mathematician notable for his contribution to quantum probability.

== Education and career ==
Hudson received his Ph.D. from the University of Oxford in 1966 under John T. Lewis with a thesis entitled Generalised Translation-Invariant Mechanics. He was appointed assistant lecturer at the University of Nottingham in 1964, promoted to a chair in 1985 and served as head of department from 1987 to 1990. He spent sabbatical semesters in Heidelberg (1978), Austin, Texas (1983), and Colorado Boulder (1996). After taking early retirement in 1997, he held part-time research posts at Nottingham Trent University (1997–2005), the Slovak Academy of Sciences (1997–2000) and Loughborough University (2005–21), and a visiting professorship at the University of Łódź (2002) which awarded him an honorary doctorate in 2013.

Hudson was a mathematical physicist who was one of the pioneers of quantum probability. An early result, now known as Hudson's theorem in quantum optics, shows that the pure quantum states with positive Wigner quasiprobability distribution are the Gaussian ones. Together with PhD students, Hudson established one of the first quantum central limit theorems, proved an early quantum de Finetti theorem, and introduced quantum Brownian motion as a non-commuting pair of families of unbounded operators, using the formalism of quantum field theory. He collaborated with K. R. Parthasarathy first at the University of Manchester, and later at University of Nottingham and at Loughborough University, on their seminal work in quantum stochastic calculus.

In later papers he developed a theory of quantum stochastic double product integrals and their application to the quantum Yang–Baxter equation, the quantisation of Lie bialgebras and quantum Lévy area.

== Selected works ==
- Hudson, R. L.; Ion, P. D. F.; K. R. Parthasarathy (1982). "Time-orthogonal unitary dilations and non-commutative Feynman-Kac formulae". Communications in Mathematical Physics. 83 (2): 261–280. Bibcode:1982CMaPh..83..261H. doi:10.1007/BF01976044. hdl:2027.42/46525.
- Hudson, R. L.; K. R. Parthasarathy (1984). "Quantum Ito's formula and stochastic evolutions". Communications in Mathematical Physics. 93 (3): 301–323. Bibcode:1984CMaPh..93..301H. doi:10.1007/bf01258530. S2CID 122848524. Archived from the original on 28 October 2015.
- Hudson, R. L.; K. R. Parthasarathy (1984). "Stochastic dilations of uniformly continuous completely positive semigroups". Acta Applicandae Mathematicae. 2 (3–4): 353–378. doi:10.1007/BF02280859. S2CID 189915711.
- Applebaum, D. B.; Hudson, R. L. (1984). "Fermion Ito's formula and stochastic evolutions". Communications in Mathematical Physics. 96 (4): 473–496. doi:10.1007/BF01212531. S2CID 120125103.
- Hudson, R. L.; Lindsay, J. M. (1985). "A non-commutative martingale representation theorem for non-Fock quantum Brownian motion". Journal of Functional Analysis. 61 (2): 202–221. doi:10.1016/0022-1236(85)90034-5.
- Hudson, R. L.; K. R. Parthasarathy (1986). "Unification of Boson and Fermion quantum stochastic calculus". Communications in Mathematical Physics. 104 (3): 457–470. Bibcode:1986CMaPh.104..457H. doi:10.1007/BF01210951. S2CID 123132851.
- Hudson, R. L.; K. R. Parthasarathy (1994). "Casimir chaos in a Boson Fock space". Journal of Functional Analysis. 119 (2): 319–339. doi:10.1006/jfan.1994.1013.
- Hudson, R. L.; Pulmannová, S. (2004). "Double product integrals and Enriquez quantisation of Lie bialgebras I: The quasitriangularity relations". Journal of Mathematical Physics. 45: 2090–2105. doi:10.1063/1.1649796.
