= Siddhartha Chib =

Statistician and econometrician

- Education: University of California, Santa Barbara; Indian Institute of Management Ahmedabad; St. Stephen's College, Delhi
- Known for: Latent-variable method for binary and categorical response models; Framework for understanding the Metropolis–Hastings algorithm; Marginal likelihood estimation; MCMC methods for stochastic volatility models; Bayesian change point models
- Awards: Fellow of the American Statistical Association
- Scientific career
- Fields: Econometrics, statistics
- Workplaces: Washington University in St. Louis
- Thesis: Some Contributions to Likelihood Based Prediction Methods (1986)
- Academic advisors: Sreenivasa Rao Jammalamadaka; Thomas F. Cooley
- Website: siddharthachib.org

Siddhartha Chib is an econometrician, statistician, and the Harry C. Hartkopf Professor of Econometrics and Statistics at the Olin Business School at Washington University in St. Louis. His work is primarily in Bayesian statistics, econometrics, and Markov chain Monte Carlo methods. Chib's research spans a wide range of topics in Bayesian statistics, with influential contributions to statistical modeling, computational methods, and Bayesian model comparison techniques.

== Career ==
Chib pioneered a latent variable framework in Albert and Chib (1993) that transformed Bayesian estimation of discrete and categorical response models. The central idea is to represent the observed discrete outcomes through underlying continuous latent variables, converting the original problem into a continuous-data hierarchical model. Conditional on the model parameters, the latent variables are simulated from appropriate truncated distributions within an MCMC scheme; conditional on these latent variables, standard Bayesian updates for the model parameters become available. This latent variable strategy provides a framework for Bayesian computation in models involving discrete, categorical, and censored outcomes. It has been adapted to a wide range of such settings. Together with the extension to multivariate categorical outcomes in Chib and Greenberg (1998), the Albert and Chib framework provides a unified approach to Bayesian inference for univariate and multivariate categorical response models.

In another widely cited contribution, Chib and Greenberg (1995), developed a framework for understanding and constructing Metropolis–Hastings algorithms. In its derivation, the paper obtains the algorithm by imposing reversibility on transitions between two states, yielding the Metropolis–Hastings acceptance rule and clarifying why the algorithm produces draws from the desired distribution. The same reasoning is used to derive accept-reject and multiple-block versions of the algorithm, providing a systematic route to constructing MCMC methods for high-dimensional models. The paper also emphasizes the practical importance of the proposal distribution and gives guidance on its choice and calibration.

For Bayesian model comparison, Chib (1995) introduced a general method that simplifies computation of the marginal likelihood from MCMC output. Direct computation of the marginal likelihood requires evaluation of an integral over the parameter space that is generally intractable in complex models. Chib's method avoids direct evaluation of this integral by using an identity that expresses the marginal likelihood as the likelihood times the prior density, divided by the posterior density ordinate, evaluated at a fixed point in the parameter space. The likelihood and prior can ordinarily be evaluated directly, while the posterior ordinate is estimated from the MCMC output. The method thereby converts the problem of evaluating a potentially high-dimensional integral into one of estimating a posterior ordinate, and is applicable to a broad range of parametric and nonparametric models. For models estimated using the Metropolis–Hastings algorithm, the method was generalized in Chib and Jeliazkov (2001). Basu and Chib (2003) further extended the approach to nonparametric Dirichlet process mixture models.

A complementary approach to Bayesian model comparison was developed in Carlin and Chib (1995). The method samples models and model-specific parameters by Markov chain Monte Carlo on a product of model spaces, with the posterior distribution over models obtained from the frequency of visits to each model. This product-space approach has proved useful for comparing complex Bayesian models.

Chib also developed methods for Bayesian estimation of stochastic volatility models in time series. Kim, Shephard, and Chib (1998) introduced an efficient mixture-based method for estimating stochastic volatility models. By taking logarithms of squared observations, the model can be represented as a state-space model whose principal non-Gaussian component is a log-chi-squared observation error. The method approximates this distribution by a finite mixture of normal distributions. Conditional on the mixture indicators, the model becomes a Gaussian state-space model, allowing the entire sequence of latent volatilities to be sampled efficiently using standard filtering and smoothing methods. An importance-sampling correction removes the approximation error, permitting exact likelihood-based and Bayesian inference. The resulting approach made estimation and model comparison for stochastic volatility models computationally practical and has been widely used. Extensions to Student-t models, models with covariates, and multivariate stochastic volatility models were developed in Chib, Nardari and Shephard (2002), Chib, Nardari and Shephard (2006) and Omori et al. (2007).

In related work on time-series models, Chib (1998) represented the multiple change-point model as a unidirectional hidden Markov model (HMM), simplifying estimation and inference and enabling the use of efficient forward-filtering and backward-sampling techniques for HMMs developed in Chib (1996) and Albert and Chib (1993).

More recently, Chib, Shin, and Simoni (2018, 2022) developed methods for Bayesian estimation and model comparison based on moment restrictions, without requiring specification of a parametric or nonparametric data-generating process. Their work provides finite-sample computational methods as well as Bernstein–von Mises and model-consistency results under correctly specified and misspecified moment restrictions.

Chib's other methodological work includes Bayesian inference for Tobit censored responses, discretely observed diffusions, univariate and multivariate ARMA processes, multivariate count responses, causal inference, hierarchical models of longitudinal data, nonparametric regression, and tailored randomized block MCMC methods for complex structural models.

== Biography ==
Chib received a bachelor's degree from St. Stephen's College, Delhi, in 1979, an M.B.A. from the Indian Institute of Management, Ahmedabad, in 1982, and a Ph.D. in economics from the University of California, Santa Barbara, in 1986. His advisors were Sreenivasa Rao Jammalamadaka and Thomas F. Cooley.

== Honors and awards ==
Chib is a fellow of the American Statistical Association (2001), an inaugural fellow of the International Society of Bayesian Analysis (2012), and a fellow of the Journal of Econometrics (1996).

== Selected publications ==
- Albert, Jim; Chib, Siddhartha (1993). Bayesian Analysis of "Binary and Polychotomous Response Data". Journal of the American Statistical Association, 88(2), 669–679.
- Chib, Siddhartha; Greenberg, Edward (1995). "Understanding the Metropolis–Hastings Algorithm". American Statistician, 49(4), 327–335.
- Chib, Siddhartha (1995). "Marginal Likelihood from the Gibbs Output". Journal of the American Statistical Association, 90(4), 1313–1321.
- Carlin, Brad; Chib, Siddhartha (1995). "Bayesian Model Choice via Markov Chain Monte Carlo Methods". Journal of the Royal Statistical Society, Series B, 57(3), 473–484.
- Chib, Siddhartha (1996). "Calculating Posterior Distributions and Modal Estimates in Markov Mixture Models". Journal of Econometrics, 75, 79–97.
- Chib, Siddhartha; Greenberg, Edward (1996). "Markov Chain Monte Carlo Simulation Methods in Econometrics". Econometric Theory. 12 (3): 409–431. doi:10.1017/S0266466600006794. JSTOR 3532527.
- Kim, Sangjoon; Shephard, Neil; Chib, Siddhartha (1998). "Stochastic Volatility: Likelihood Inference and Comparison with ARCH Models", Review of Economic Studies, 65, 361–393.
- Chib, Siddhartha (1998). "Estimation and Comparison of Multiple Change Point Models". Journal of Econometrics, 86, 221-241.
- Chib, Siddhartha; Greenberg, Edward (1998). "Analysis of Multivariate Probit Models". Biometrika, 85, 347-361.
- Chib, Siddhartha; Jeliazkov, Ivan (2001). "Marginal Likelihood from the Metropolis-Hastings Output". Journal of the American Statistical Association, 96(1), 270-281.
- Eleriain, Ola; Chib, Siddhartha; Shephard, Neil (2001). "Likelihood Inference for Discretely Observed Nonlinear Diffusions". Econometrica. 69 (4): 959–993. doi:10.1111/1468-0262.00226. Archived from the original on 2020-10-26.
- Chib, Siddhartha (2001). "Markov Chain Monte Carlo: Computation and Inference" (PDF). In Heckman, Jim; Leamer, Ed (eds.). Handbook of Econometrics, volume 5. Elsevier. pp. 3569–3649.
- Chib, Siddhartha; Nardari, Federico; Shephard, Neil (2002). "Markov Chain Monte Carlo Methods for Stochastic Volatility Models". Journal of Econometrics, 108, 281-316.
- Basu, Sanjib; Chib, Siddhartha (2003). "Marginal Likelihood and Bayes Factors for Dirichlet Process Mixture Models". Journal of the American Statistical Association. 98 (461): 224–235. doi:10.1198/01621450338861947. JSTOR 30045209.
- Chib, Siddhartha; Jeliazkov, Ivan (2006). "Inference in Semiparametric Dynamic Models for Binary Longitudinal Data". Journal of the American Statistical Association. 101 (2): 685–700. doi:10.1198/016214505000000871. JSTOR 27590727. S2CID 10169747.
- Chib, Siddhartha; Ergashev, Bakhodir (2009). "Analysis of Multifactor Affine Yield Curve Models" (PDF). Journal of the American Statistical Association. 104 (488): 1324–1337. doi:10.1198/jasa.2009.ap08029.
- Chib, Siddhartha; Ramamurthy, Srikanth (2010). "Tailored randomized block MCMC methods with application to DSGE models". Journal of Econometrics, 155, 19-38.
- Chib, Siddhartha; Shin, Minchul; Simoni, Anna (2018). "Bayesian Estimation and Comparison of Moment Condition Models". Journal of the American Statistical Association, 113(4), 1656-1668.
- Chib, Siddhartha; Shin, Minchul; Simoni, Anna (2022). "Bayesian Estimation and Comparison of Conditional Moment Models". Journal of the Royal Statistical Society, Series B, 84 (3), 740–764.
