= Veeravalli S. Varadarajan =

Indian mathematician (1937–2019)

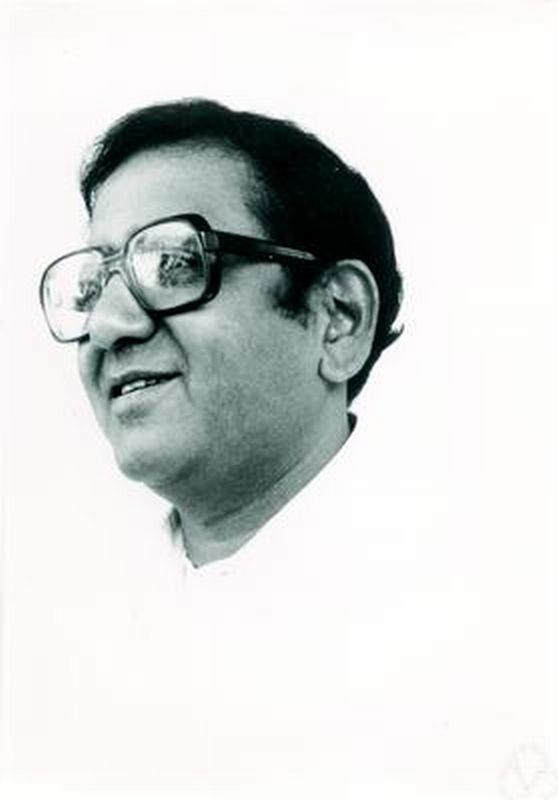
- Born: 18 May 1937; Bengalaru, India
- Died: 25 April 2019 (aged 81); Santa Monica, California, U.S.
- Education: Loyola College, Madras; Presidency College, Madras; Indian Statistical Institute, Kolkata
- Known for: Trombi–Varadarajan theorem
- Awards: Onsager Medal
- Scientific career
- Fields: Mathematics
- Workplaces: University of California, Los Angeles; Indian Statistical Institute, Kolkata
- Doctoral advisor: C. R. Rao

Veeravalli Seshadri Varadarajan (18 May 1937 – 25 April 2019) was an Indian mathematician at the University of California, Los Angeles, who worked in many areas of mathematics, including probability, Lie groups and their representations, quantum mechanics, differential equations, and supersymmetry.

== Biography ==
Varadarajan's father, Seshadri, was an Inspector of Schools in the Department of Education. He was transferred to Madras where the medium of instruction was generally English. After Varadarajan completed his high school studies, he joined Intermediate for two years at Loyola College, Madras where he was taught mathematics by K.A. Adivarahan, a very strict disciplinarian who made a strong impression on him. Varadarajan received his undergraduate degree in 1957 from Presidency College, Madras and his doctorate in 1960 from the Indian Statistical Institute in Calcutta, under the supervision of C. R. Rao. He was one of the "famous four" at the Indian Statistical Institute during 1956-1963 (the others being Ramaswamy Ranga Rao, K. R. Parthasarathy, and S. R. Srinivasa Varadhan).

In 1960 Varadarajan went to Princeton University as a post-doctoral fellow and in the Fall of 1960 he went to the University of Washington, Seattle where he spent the academic year, followed by a year at the Courant Institute at NYU. He returned to the Indian Statistical Institute in 1962.

He joined the Department of Mathematics at UCLA in 1965. Varadarajan was a member of the Institute for Advanced Study during the periods September 1968 until December 1968 and January 1976 until June 1976.

In March 2019, it was announced by UCLA that Varadarajan and his wife had donated $1 million to the Department of Mathematics at UCLA to establish the Ramanujan Visiting Professorship.

== Contributions ==
Varadarajan's early work, including his doctoral thesis, was in the area of probability theory. He then moved into representation theory where he has done some of his best known work. He has also done work in mathematical physics, in particular quantum theory and p-adic themes in physics. In the 1980s, he wrote a series of papers with Donald Babbitt on the theory of differential equations with irregular singularities. His latest work has been in supersymmetry.

He introduced Kostant–Parthasarathy–Ranga Rao–Varadarajan determinants along with Bertram Kostant, K. R. Parthasarathy and R. Ranga Rao in 1967, the Trombi–Varadarajan theorem in 1972 and the Enright–Varadarajan modules in 1975.

== Recognition ==
He was awarded the Onsager Medal in 1998 for his work. He was recognized along with 23 Indian and Indian American members "who have made outstanding contributions to the creation, exposition advancement, communication, and utilization of mathematics" by the Fellows of the American Mathematical Society program on 1 November 2012.

== Bibliography ==
- Varadarajan, Veeravalli S (1984). Geometry of quantum theory, Springer-Verlag. 1st Edition 1968.
- Varadarajan, V. S. (1984), Lie groups, Lie algebras, and their representations, Springer Verlag, ISBN 978-0387909691; 1st edition. 1974.
- Varadarajan, V. S. (1977), Harmonic analysis on real reductive groups, Springer-Verlag
- Gangolli, Ramesh; Varadarajan, V. S. (1983), Harmonic analysis of spherical functions on real reductive groups, Springer-Verlag
- Varadarajan, V. S. (1999), An Introduction to Harmonic Analysis on Semisimple Lie Groups, Cambridge University Press, ISBN 9780521663625; 1st edition. 1989.
- Varadarajan, V. S. (1998), Algebra in Ancient and Modern Times, AMS & Hindustan Book Agency
- Varadarajan, V. S. (1999), The selected works of V. S. Varadarajan, Providence, R.I.: American Mathematical Society, ISBN 978-0-8218-1068-2, MR 1647109
- Varadarajan, Veeravalli S. (2004). Supersymmetry for mathematicians: an introduction. Vol. 11. American Mathematical Society.
- Varadarajan, V. S. (2006). Euler Through Time: A New Look at Old Themes. American Mathematical Society. ISBN 9780821835807.
- Ferrara, Sergio; Fioresi, Rita; Varadarajan, Veeravalli S. (2011). Supersymmetry in Mathematics and Physics: UCLA Los Angeles, USA 2010. Springer Verlag. doi:10.1007/978-3-642-21744-9. ISBN 978-3-642-21743-2. LCCN 2011934804.
- Varadarajan, Veeravalli (2011). Reflections on Quanta, Symmetries, and Supersymmetries. Springer-Verlag. ISBN 978-1-4899-8944-4.

== Selected publications ==
- Parthasarathy, K., Rao, R., & Varadarajan, V. (1967). Representations of Complex Semi-Simple Lie Groups and Lie Algebras. Annals of Mathematics, 85(3), second series, 383–429. doi:10.2307/1970351
- Trombi, P. C.; Varadarajan, V. S. (1971), "Spherical transforms of semisimple Lie groups", Annals of Mathematics, Second Series, 94 (2): 246–303, doi:10.2307/1970861, JSTOR 1970861, MR 0289725.
- Enright, T., & Varadarajan, V. (1975). On an Infinitesimal Characterization of the Discrete Series. Annals of Mathematics, 102(1), second series, 1–15. doi:10.2307/1970970

== See also ==
Born rule
