= India Science Award =

Science award

- Awarded for: Research in science
- Location: New Delhi
- Presented by: Indian Science Congress Association; Ministry of Science and Technology (India)
- First award: 2004

India Science Award is one of the highest and the most prestigious national recognition by the Government of India for outstanding contribution to science. The primary and essential criterion for the award is demonstrated and widely accepted excellence in science. The award covers all areas of research in science including engineering, medicine and agriculture. The prize money is ₹25 lakhs, and it also carries a citation and a gold medal. The award is announced and presented every year at the Indian Science Congress (ISC).

The award was instituted by the 10th Prime Minister of India Shri Atal Bihari Vajpayee in 2003. The first award, for the year 2004, was given to a renowned chemist Prof CNR Rao, for his works in solid state and material chemistry, by Prime Minister Manmohan Singh at the inauguration of the 93rd Indian Science Congress on 3 January 2006.

== History ==
India Science Award was launched at the 90th Indian Science Congress on 3 January 2003, held at Bangalore University, by the Prime Minister of India. On 30 June 2003 the Ministry of Science and Technology (India) approved the framework and guidelines of the award. The meeting was attended by 20 eminent scientists, government officials, under the chairmanship of the Minister of Science and Technology.

== Criteria ==
India Science Award is given annually in recognition of distinguished achievements in science, including medicine, engineering and agriculture. The recipient is a scientist, of no age limit, who had made a groundbreaking scientific research that is widely demonstrated and accepted, and the work done primarily in India. Originality and innovatory outputs are more important than mere quantity. Contribution to scientific development of the country has a huge impression. Groups or institutions are not eligible to receive this award. There can only be a maximum of two winners of the prize in a given year if more than one nominee is eligible.

== Recipients ==
Year	Recipient	Field
2004	C. N. R. Rao	Solid state chemistry and materials science
2005	Arcot Ramachandran	Environment Planning, Co-ordination and Research Programme
2006	Siddhartha Paul Tiwari	Integrated rural agriculture development: science and technology
2007	Upinder Singh Bhalla	Neuroscience
2008	Govindarajan Padmanaban	Vaccine Development
2009	Madhav Gadgil	Environmental Protection
2010	Calyampudi Radhakrishna Rao	Statistical theory and methodology

== Discontinued after 2010 ==
After 2010, the India Science Award was discontinued following its merger with the Shanti Swarup Bhatnagar Prize for Science and Technology. The budget of the Shanti Swarup Bhatnagar Prize for Science and Technology was accordingly increased.

== See also ==
- List of general science and technology awards
