= Munipalle, Uppalaguptam Mandal =

Munipalle
- village
- Interactive map of Munipalle
- Location in Andhra Pradesh, India Munipalle (India)
- Coordinates: 16.5653°N 82.1065°E
- Country: India
- State: Andhra Pradesh
- District: Dr. B.R. Ambedkar Konaseema

Area
  - Total: 2 km^{2} (0.77 sq mi)

Population (2011)
  - Total: 1,453
  - Density: 616/km^{2} (1,600/sq mi)

Languages
  - Official: Telugu
- Time zone: UTC+5:30 (IST)
- Postal code: 533 446

Munipalle is a village in Uppalaguptam Mandal, Dr. B.R. Ambedkar Konaseema district in the state of Andhra Pradesh in India.

== Geography ==
Munipalle is located at 16.5653°N 82.1065°E.

== Demographics ==
As of 2011 India census, Munipalle had a population of 1453, out of which 746 were male and 707 were female. The population of children below 6 years of age was 10%. The literacy rate of the village was 83%.
