= Ramaswamy Ranga Rao =

Indian mathematician (1939-2021)

- Born: 1935; India
- Died: 27 August 2021 (aged 85–86); Chennai, India
- Citizenship: Indian
- Education: Ramakrishna Mission Vivekananda College; University of Madras (PhD) Indian Statistical Institute
- Scientific career
- Fields: Mathematics
- Workplaces: University of Illinois Urbana-Champaign; Indian Statistical Institute
- Doctoral advisor: C. R. Rao

Ramaswamy Ranga Rao (1935 - 27 August 2021) was a prominent Indian mathematician who made fundamental contributions to statistics, Lie groups, and Lie algebras and worked as professor for most of his career in the University of Illinois Urbana-Champaign until 2001. He finished his Ph.D. under the supervision of C.R. Rao from Indian Statistical Institute. He was one of the "famous four" students of Rao: (the others were K. R. Parthasarathy, Veeravalli S. Varadarajan, and S. R. Srinivasa Varadhan) in ISI during 1956-1963.

After retiring in 2001, he moved to Chennai in 2015. He died on 27 August 2021.

== Early life and education ==
Ramaswamy Ranga Rao was born in India in 1935 and completed his undergraduation from Ramakrishna Mission Vivekananda College in Chennai where he was senior to his fellow mathematician KR Parthasarathy and completed his PhD from the Indian Statistical Institute in Kolkata under CR Rao he was part of a group of four eminent mathematicians from ISI.

== Selected publications ==
- Bhattacharya, R. N.; Ranga Rao, R. (1976), Normal approximation and asymptotic expansions, John Wiley & Sons, MR 0436272. Russian translation by V. V. Sazonov, Nauka, 1982, MR 0702344. 2nd ed., Robert E. Krieger Publishing Co., 1986, MR 0855460. Chosen as a classic in the SIAM series on applied mathematics.
- Ranga Rao, R. (1993), "On some explicit formulas in the theory of Weil representation", Pacific Journal of Mathematics, 157 (2): 335–371, MR 1197062.
