= Genetic Epidemiology (journal) =

- Discipline: Medical genetics
- Language: English
- Edited by: Sanjay Shete

Publication details
- History: 1984-present
- Publisher: John Wiley & Sons on behalf of the International Genetic Epidemiology Society
- Frequency: 8/year
- Impact factor: 2.135 (2020)

Standard abbreviations
- ISO 4: Genet. Epidemiol.

Indexing
- ISSN: 0741-0395 (print); 1098-2272 (web)
- OCLC no.: 15915649

Links
- Journal homepage; Online access; Online archive

Genetic Epidemiology is a peer-reviewed medical journal for research on the genetic epidemiology of human traits in families and populations. It is published by John Wiley & Sons on behalf of the International Genetic Epidemiology Society.

According to the Journal Citation Reports, the journal has a 2020 impact factor of 2.135.
