= Mathematical table =

List of values of a mathematical function

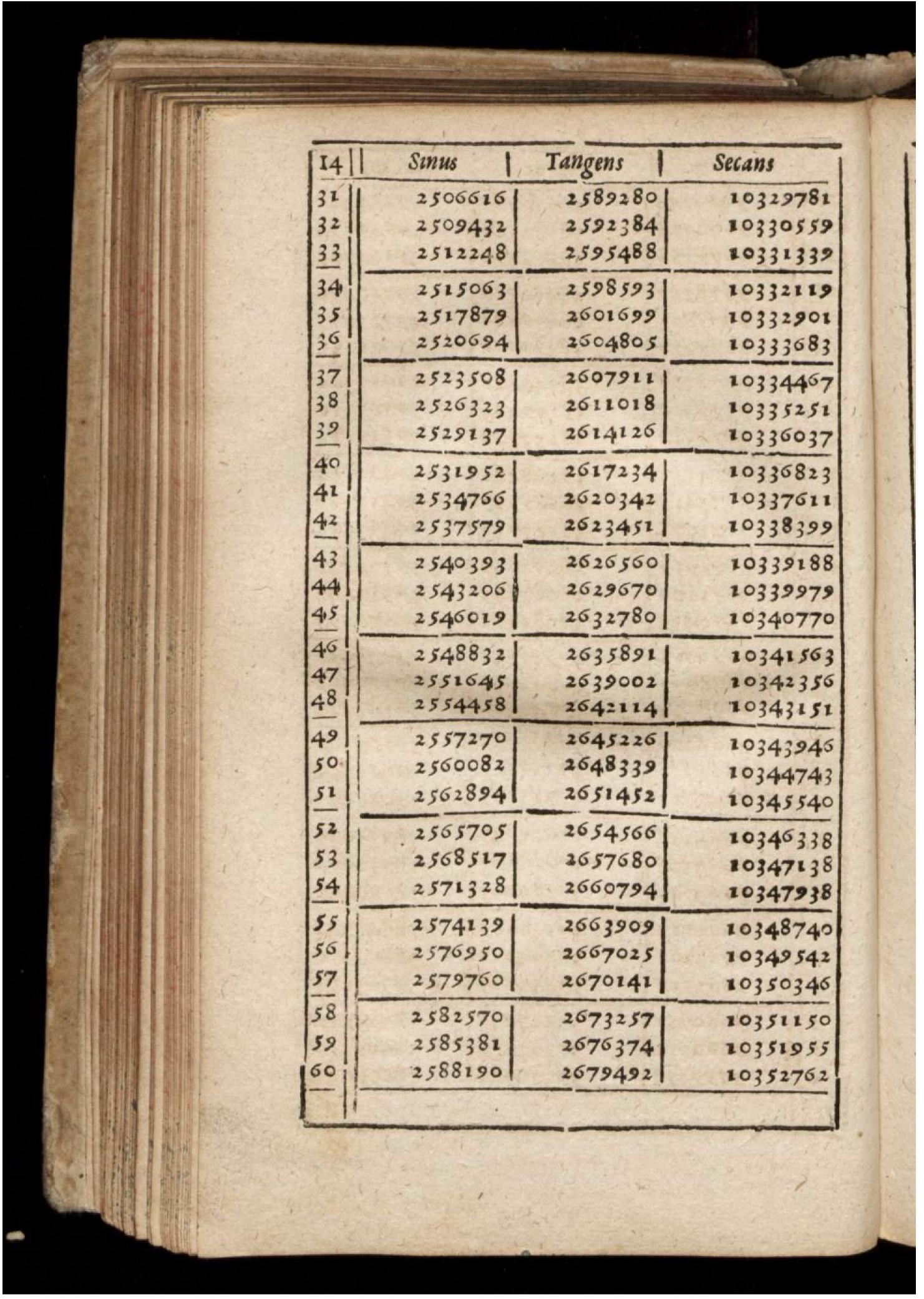
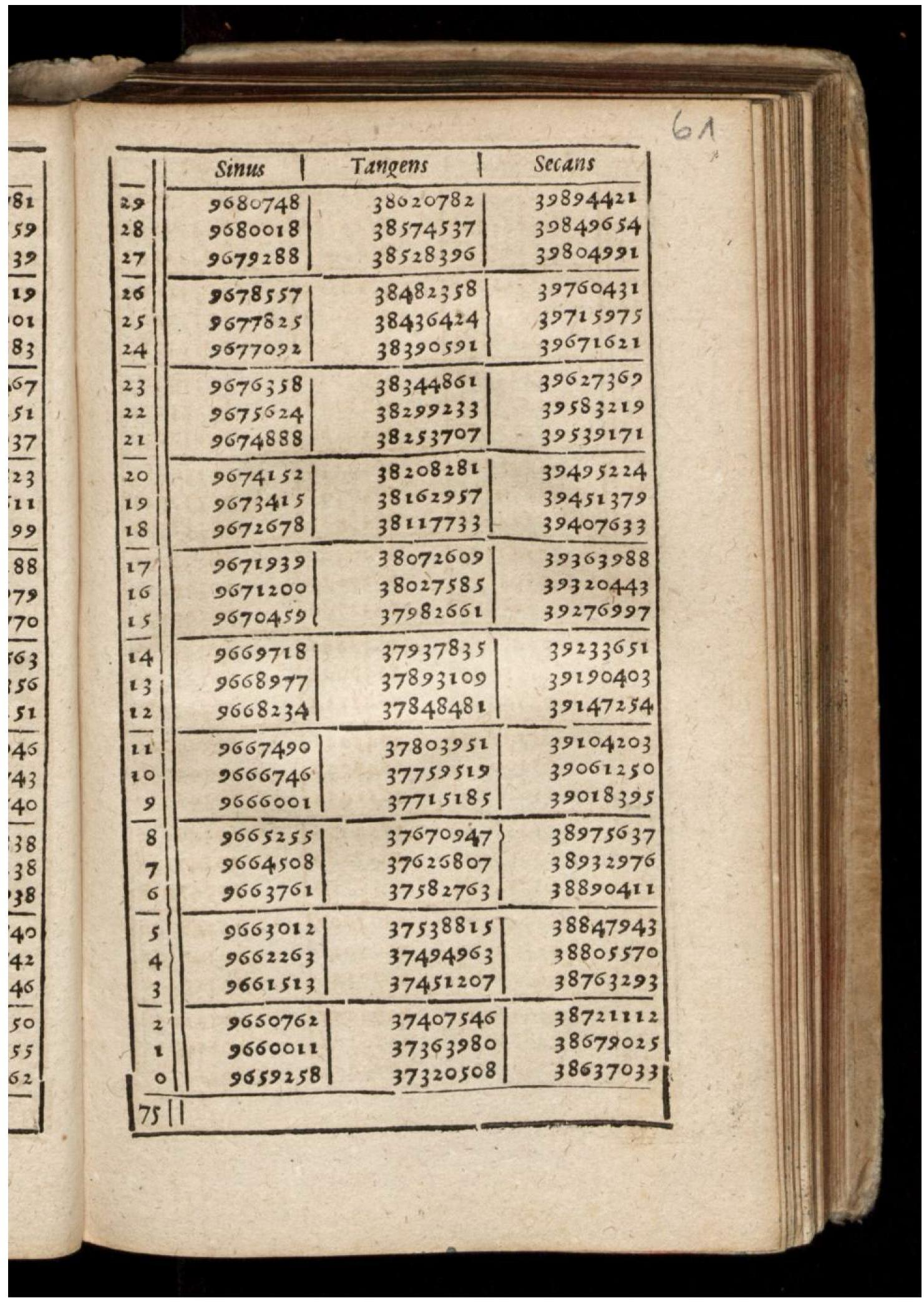
Facing pages from a 1619 book of mathematical tables by Matthias Bernegger, showing values for the sine, tangent and secant trigonometric functions. Angles less than 45° are found on the left page, angles greater than 45° on the right. Cosine, cotangent and cosecant are found by using the entry on the opposite page.

Mathematical tables are tables of information, usually numbers, showing the results of a calculation with varying arguments. Trigonometric tables were used in ancient Greece and India for applications to astronomy and celestial navigation, and continued to be widely used until electronic calculators became cheap and plentiful in the 1970s, in order to simplify and drastically speed up computation. Tables of logarithms and trigonometric functions were common in math and science textbooks, and specialized tables were published for numerous applications.

== Types ==
=== Trigonometric ===
In mathematics, tables of trigonometric functions are useful in a number of areas. Before the existence of pocket calculators, trigonometric tables were essential for navigation, science and engineering. The calculation of mathematical tables was an important area of study, which led to the development of the first mechanical computing devices. Trigonometric calculations played an important role in the early study of astronomy. Early tables were constructed by repeatedly applying trigonometric identities (like the half-angle and angle-sum identities) to compute new values from old ones.

Modern computers and pocket calculators now generate trigonometric function values on demand, using special libraries of mathematical code. Often, these libraries use pre-calculated tables internally, and compute the required value by using an appropriate interpolation method. Interpolation of simple look-up tables of trigonometric functions is still used in computer graphics, where only modest accuracy may be required and speed is often paramount.

Another important application of trigonometric tables and generation schemes is for fast Fourier transform (FFT) algorithms, where the same trigonometric function values (called twiddle factors) must be evaluated many times in a given transform, especially in the common case where many transforms of the same size are computed. In this case, calling generic library routines every time is unacceptably slow. One option is to call the library routines once, to build up a table of those trigonometric values that will be needed, but this requires significant memory to store the table. The other possibility, since a regular sequence of values is required, is to use a recurrence formula to compute the trigonometric values on the fly. Significant research has been devoted to finding accurate, stable recurrence schemes in order to preserve the accuracy of the FFT (which is very sensitive to trigonometric errors).

A trigonometry table is essentially a reference chart that presents the values of sine, cosine, tangent, and other trigonometric functions for various angles. These angles are usually arranged across the top row of the table, while the different trigonometric functions are labeled in the first column on the left. To locate the value of a specific trigonometric function at a certain angle, you would find the row for the function and follow it across to the column under the desired angle.

=== Tables of logarithms ===
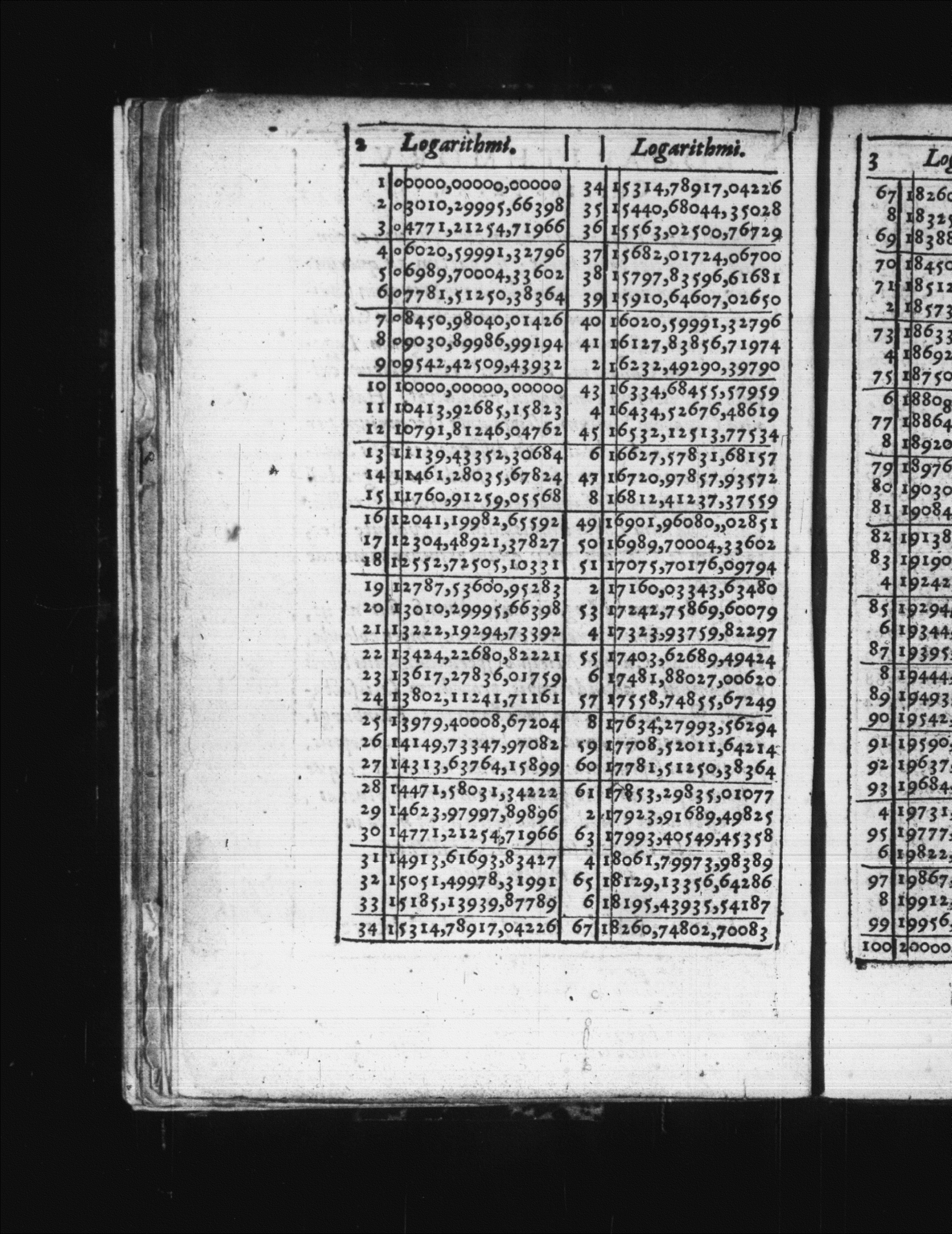
A page from Henry Briggs' 1617 Logarithmorum Chilias Prima showing the base-10 (common) logarithm of the integers 0 to 67 to fourteen decimal places.

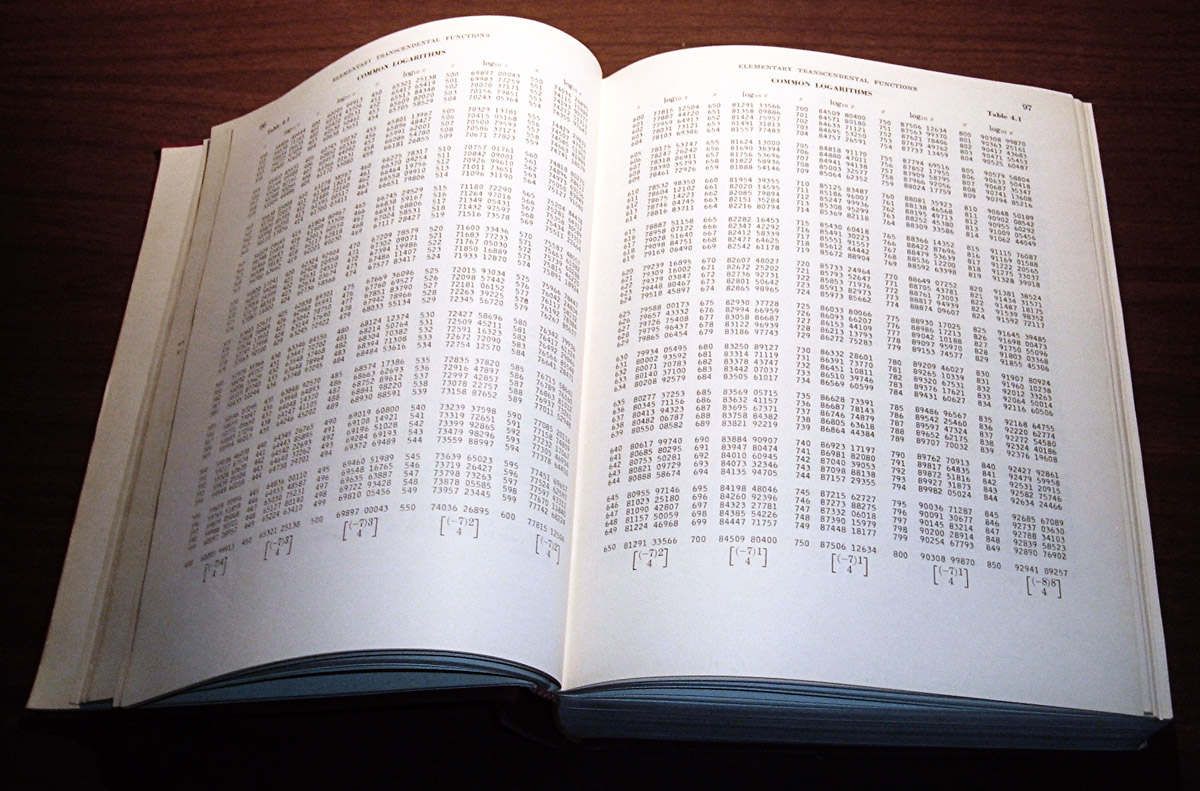
Part of a 20th-century table of common logarithms in the reference book Abramowitz and Stegun.

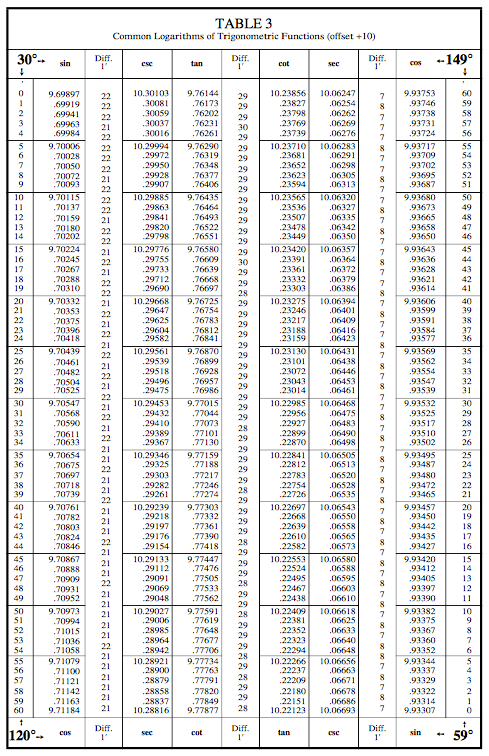
A page from a table of logarithms of trigonometric functions from the 2002 American Practical Navigator. Columns of differences are included to aid interpolation.

Tables containing common logarithms (base-10) were extensively used in computations prior to the advent of electronic calculators and computers because logarithms convert problems of multiplication and division into much easier addition and subtraction problems. Base-10 logarithms have an additional property that is unique and useful: The common logarithm of numbers greater than one that differ only by a factor of a power of ten all have the same fractional part, known as the mantissa. Tables of common logarithms typically included only the mantissas; the integer part of the logarithm, known as the characteristic, could easily be determined by counting digits in the original number. A similar principle allows for the quick calculation of logarithms of positive numbers less than 1. Thus a single table of common logarithms can be used for the entire range of positive decimal numbers. See common logarithm for details on the use of characteristics and mantissas.

==== History ====
In 1544, Michael Stifel published Arithmetica integra, which contains a table of integers and powers of 2 that has been considered an early version of a logarithmic table.

The method of logarithms was publicly propounded by John Napier in 1614, in a book entitled Mirifici Logarithmorum Canonis Descriptio (Description of the Wonderful Rule of Logarithms). The book contained fifty-seven pages of explanatory matter and ninety pages of tables related to natural logarithms. The English mathematician Henry Briggs visited Napier in 1615, and proposed a re-scaling of Napier's logarithms to form what is now known as the common or base-10 logarithms. Napier delegated to Briggs the computation of a revised table. In 1617, they published Logarithmorum Chilias Prima ("The First Thousand Logarithms"), which gave a brief account of logarithms and a table for the first 1000 integers calculated to the 14th decimal place. Prior to Napier's invention, there had been other techniques of similar scopes, such as the use of tables of progressions, extensively developed by Jost Bürgi around 1600.

The computational advance available via common logarithms, the converse of powered numbers or exponential notation, was such that it made calculations by hand much quicker.

== History and use ==
Mathematical tables have been used to record numerical data in written form. Ancient Mesopotamian scribes used tabular formats for mathematical, administrative, metrological, and astronomical material, making tabulation one of the oldest surviving forms of organized numerical record keeping.

The first tables of trigonometric functions known to be made were by Hipparchus (c.190 – c.120 BCE) and Menelaus (fl. 100 CE), but both have been lost. Along with the surviving table of Ptolemy (c. 90 – c.168 CE), they were all tables of chords and not of half-chords, that is, the sine function. The table produced by the Indian mathematician Āryabhaṭa (476–550 CE) is considered the first sine table ever constructed. Āryabhaṭa's table remained the standard sine table of ancient India. There were continuous attempts to improve the accuracy of this table, culminating in the discovery of the power series expansions of the sine and cosine functions by Madhava of Sangamagrama (c.1350 – c.1425), and the tabulation of a sine table by Madhava with values accurate to seven or eight decimal places.

These mathematical tables from 1925 were distributed by the College Entrance Examination Board to students taking the mathematics portions of the tests

Tables of common logarithms were used until the invention of computers and electronic calculators to do rapid multiplications, divisions, and exponentiations, including the extraction of nth roots. Logarithm tables allowed users to replace some multiplication and division problems with the use of logarithms and antilogarithms. After John Napier introduced logarithms in the early seventeenth century, table makers such as Henry Briggs and Edmund Gunter produced logarithmic and trigonometric-logarithmic tables for practical calculation. These tables reduced the amount of arithmetic that users had to perform directly, especially in repeated calculations.

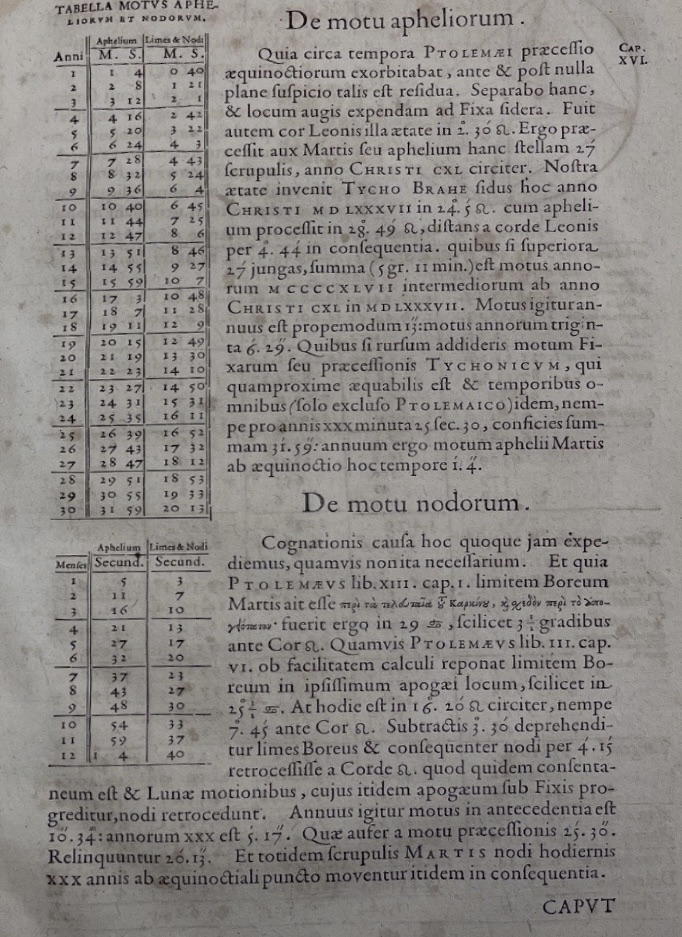
Page from Johannes Kepler’s Astronomia nova showing the printed table “Tabella motus apheliorum et nodorum.” The table gives numerical values for the motion of aphelia and nodes.

Astronomical tables and ephemerides were used to record and predict the positions of celestial bodies. Astronomers used tables to compare observations with predicted positions and to preserve results for later use. Since many problems in celestial mechanics could not be solved exactly in closed form, table makers used approximation methods in astronomy, navigation, surveying, and calendar construction. In printed astronomical works, tables were often set near explanatory text, so a reader could follow a calculation and check it against the surrounding argument. This format mattered because an astronomical prediction was rarely a single calculation. A user might first consult one prepared column and then use another part of the page to compare the result with an observed position. In that setting, the table made a longer computational procedure easier to repeat.

The production of large mathematical tables could also require organized labor. In the 1790s, Gaspard de Prony directed a French project to produce logarithmic and trigonometric tables through a division of labor among trained calculators. Senior mathematicians chose the methods, another group organized the work, and other workers carried out repeated arithmetic operations. The project has been described as a “computation factory” because table production was arranged as a coordinated process with separate stages for calculation and verification.

Mechanical special-purpose computers known as difference engines were proposed in the 19th century to tabulate polynomial approximations of logarithmic functions — that is, to compute large logarithmic tables. This was motivated mainly by errors in logarithmic tables made by human computers of the time. Difference methods allowed many entries in a table to be generated by repeated addition rather than by independent calculation. Several nineteenth-century difference-engine designs were connected to table making, since printed tables required long sequences of numerical entries with consistent accuracy. These machines were designed to automate a specific part of mathematical table production rather than to serve as general-purpose computers in the modern sense.

Early digital computers were developed during World War II in part to produce specialized mathematical tables for aiming artillery. This placed some table making under military and government administration, where large quantities of numerical results had to be produced and checked. One of the last major efforts to construct such tables was the Mathematical Tables Project that was started in the United States in 1938 as a project of the Works Progress Administration (WPA), employing 450 out-of-work clerks to tabulate higher mathematical functions. It lasted through World War II. The project shows that table making continued as a form of organized human computation into the twentieth century. Its workers calculated entries, checked results, and prepared tables for publication. The project also occupied a transitional position between manual table making and later electronic computation.

The use of printed mathematical tables declined in the second half of the twentieth century as electronic calculators became cheaper and more portable. The HP-35, introduced in 1972, was an early handheld scientific calculator and could perform many functions that had previously required printed tables or slide rules. From 1972 onwards, with the launch and growing use of scientific calculators, most mathematical tables went out of use.

Tables of special functions are still used. For example, the use of tables of values of the cumulative distribution function of the normal distribution – so-called standard normal tables – remains commonplace today, especially in schools, although the use of scientific and graphing calculators as well as spreadsheet and dedicated statistical software on personal computers is making such tables redundant.

Creating tables stored in random-access memory is a common code optimization technique in computer programming, where the use of such tables speeds up calculations in those cases where a table lookup is faster than the corresponding calculations, particularly if the computer in question does not have a hardware implementation of the calculations. In essence, one trades computing speed for the computer memory space required to store the tables. In computer programming, the table is usually no longer a printed object. However, the basic operation is similar: a value is prepared in advance so that it can be retrieved later instead of recalculated.

== See also ==
- Abramowitz and Stegun Handbook of Mathematical Functions
- BINAS, a Dutch science handbook
- Difference engine
- Ephemeris
- Group table
- Handbook
- History of logarithms
- Nautical almanac
- Matrix
- MAOL, a Finnish handbook for science
- Multiplication table
- Numerical analysis
- Random number table
  A Million Random Digits with 100,000 Normal Deviates
- Ready reckoner
- Reference book
- Rubber book Handbook of Chemistry & Physics
- Standard normal table
- Table (information)
- Truth table
- Jurij Vega
