= Chord function =

The term chord function may refer to:

- Diatonic function – in music, the role of a chord in relation to a diatonic key;
- In mathematics, the length of a chord of a circle as a trigonometric function of the length of the corresponding arc; see in particular Ptolemy's table of chords.
