= Āryabhaṭa's sine table =

First sine table ever constructed

Arc and chord of a circle

Āryabhata's sine table is a set of twenty-four numbers given in the astronomical treatise Āryabhatiya composed by the fifth century Indian mathematician and astronomer Āryabhata (476–550 CE), for the computation of the half-chords of a certain set of arcs of a circle. The set of numbers appears in verse 12 in Chapter 1 Dasagitika of Aryabhatiya and is the first table of sines. It is not a table in the modern sense of a mathematical table; that is, it is not a set of numbers arranged into rows and columns. Āryabhaṭa's table is also not a set of values of the trigonometric sine function in a conventional sense; it is a table of the first differences of the values of trigonometric sines expressed in arcminutes, and because of this the table is also referred to as Āryabhaṭa's table of sine-differences.

Āryabhaṭa's table was the first sine table ever constructed in the history of mathematics. The now lost tables of Hipparchus (c. 190 BC – c. 120 BC) and Menelaus (c. 70–140 CE) and those of Ptolemy (c. AD 90 – c. 168) were all tables of chords and not of half-chords. Āryabhaṭa's table remained as the standard sine table of ancient India. There were continuous attempts to improve the accuracy of this table. These endeavors culminated in the eventual discovery of the power series expansions of the sine and cosine functions by Madhava of Sangamagrama (c. 1350 – c. 1425), the founder of the Kerala school of astronomy and mathematics, and the tabulation of a sine table by Madhava with values accurate to seven or eight decimal places.

== The table ==
=== In modern notations ===
The values encoded in Āryabhaṭa's Sanskrit verse can be decoded using the numerical scheme explained in Āryabhaṭīya, and the decoded numbers are listed in the table below. In the table, the angle measures relevant to Āryabhaṭa's sine table are listed in the second column. The third column contains the list the numbers contained in the Sanskrit verse given above in Devanagari script. For the convenience of users unable to read Devanagari, these word-numerals are reproduced in the fourth column in ISO 15919 transliteration. The next column contains these numbers in the Hindu-Arabic numerals. Āryabhaṭa's numbers are the first differences in the values of sines. The corresponding value of sine (or more precisely, of jya) can be obtained by summing up the differences up to that difference. Thus the value of jya corresponding to 18° 45′ is the sum 225 + 224 + 222 + 219 + 215 = 1105. For assessing the accuracy of Āryabhaṭa's computations, the modern values of jyas are given in the last column of the table.

In the Indian mathematical tradition, the sine ( or jya) of an angle is not a ratio of numbers. It is the length of a certain line segment, a certain half-chord. The radius of the base circle is basic parameter for the construction of such tables. Historically, several tables have been constructed using different values for this parameter. Āryabhaṭa has chosen the number 3438 as the value of radius of the base circle for the computation of his sine table. The rationale of the choice of this parameter is the idea of measuring the circumference of a circle in angle measures. In astronomical computations distances are measured in degrees, minutes, seconds, etc. In this measure, the circumference of a circle is 360° = (60 × 360) minutes = 21600 minutes. The radius of the circle, the measure of whose circumference is 21600 minutes, is 21600 / 2π minutes. Computing this using the value π = 3.1416 known to Aryabhata one gets the radius of the circle as 3438 minutes approximately. Āryabhaṭa's sine table is based on this value for the radius of the base circle. It has not yet been established who is the first ever to use this value for the base radius. But Aryabhatiya is the earliest surviving text containing a reference to this basic constant.

Sl. No	Angle ( A ) (in degrees, arcminutes)	Value in Āryabhaṭa's numerical notation (in Devanagari)	Value in Āryabhaṭa's numerical notation (in ISO 15919 transliteration)	Value in Hindu-Arabic numerals	Āryabhaṭa's value of jya (A)	Modern value of jya (A) (3438 × sin (A))
1	03° 45′	मखि	makhi	225	225′	224.8560
2	07° 30′	भखि	bhakhi	224	449′	448.7490
3	11° 15′	फखि	phakhi	222	671′	670.7205
4	15° 00′	धखि	dhakhi	219	890′	889.8199
5	18° 45′	णखि	ṇakhi	215	1105′	1105.1089
6	22° 30′	ञखि	ñakhi	210	1315′	1315.6656
7	26° 15′	ङखि	ṅakhi	205	1520′	1520.5885
8	30° 00′	हस्झ	hasjha	199	1719′	1719.0000
9	33° 45′	स्ककि	skaki	191	1910′	1910.0505
10	37° 30′	किष्ग	kiṣga	183	2093′	2092.9218
11	41° 15′	श्घकि	śghaki	174	2267′	2266.8309
12	45° 00′	किघ्व	kighva	164	2431′	2431.0331
13	48° 45′	घ्लकि	ghlaki	154	2585′	2584.8253
14	52° 30′	किग्र	kigra	143	2728′	2727.5488
15	56° 15′	हक्य	hakya	131	2859′	2858.5925
16	60° 00′	धकि	dhaki	119	2978′	2977.3953
17	63° 45′	किच	kica	106	3084′	3083.4485
18	67° 30′	स्ग	sga	93	3177′	3176.2978
19	71° 15′	झश	jhaśa	79	3256′	3255.5458
20	75° 00′	ङ्व	ṅva	65	3321′	3320.8530
21	78° 45′	क्ल	kla	51	3372′	3371.9398
22	82° 30′	प्त	pta	37	3409′	3408.5874
23	86° 15′	फ	pha	22	3431′	3430.6390
24	90° 00′	छ	cha	7	3438′	3438.0000

== Āryabhaṭa's computational method ==
The second section of Āryabhaṭiya, titled Ganitapādd, a contains a stanza indicating a method for the computation of the sine table. There are several ambiguities in correctly interpreting the meaning of this verse. For example, the following is a translation of the verse given by Katz wherein the words in square brackets are insertions of the translator and not translations of texts in the verse.

- "When the second half-[chord] partitioned is less than the first half-chord, which is [approximately equal to] the [corresponding] arc, by a certain amount, the remaining [sine-differences] are less [than the previous ones] each by that amount of that divided by the first half-chord."

This may be referring to the fact that the second derivative of the sine function is equal to the negative of the sine function.

== Alleged influence hypothesis and rebuttal ==
Some historians of mathematics have argued that the sine table given in Āryabhaṭiya was an adaptation of earlier such tables constructed by mathematicians and astronomers of ancient Greece. Historian David Pingree was an exponent of such a view. Assuming this hypothesis, G. J. Toomer writes, "Hardly any documentation exists for the earliest arrival of Greek astronomical models in India, or for that matter what those models would have looked like. So it is very difficult to ascertain the extent to which what has come down to us represents transmitted knowledge, and what is original with Indian scientists. ... The truth is probably a tangled mixture of both."

However, this notion of transmission has been challenged and refuted by multiple scholars. Bo Klintberg demonstrated that the scholarly consensus advocating for a Greek-origin promoted by historians like Pingree and others, relied almost entirely on Toomer's 1973 paper, which Toomer himself cast doubt on his earlier mathematical reconstructions in the footnote in his 1984 paper, yet subsequent historians continued to cite the original claims of Toomers as conclusive proof completely ignoring the discrepancies.

== See also ==
- Madhava's sine table
- Bhaskara I's sine approximation formula
