= Ptolemy's table of chords =

2nd century AD trigonometric table

The table of chords, created by the Greek astronomer, geometer, and geographer Ptolemy in Egypt during the 2nd century AD, is a trigonometric table in Book I, chapter 11 of Ptolemy's Almagest, a treatise on mathematical astronomy. It is essentially equivalent to a table of values of the sine function. It was the earliest trigonometric table extensive enough for many practical purposes, including those of astronomy (an earlier table of chords by Hipparchus gave chords only for arcs that were multiples of 7 1/2° = π/24 radians). Since the 8th and 9th centuries, the sine and other trigonometric functions have been used in Islamic mathematics and astronomy, reforming the production of sine tables. Khwarizmi and Habash al-Hasib later produced a set of trigonometric tables.

== The chord function and the table ==
Example: The length of the chord subtending a (109 1/2)° arc is approximately 98.

A chord of a circle is a line segment whose endpoints are on the circle. Ptolemy used a circle whose diameter is 120 parts. He tabulated the length of a chord whose endpoints are separated by an arc of n degrees, for n ranging from 1/2 to 180 by increments of 1/2. In modern notation, the length of the chord corresponding to an arc of θ degrees is

$$\begin{align}
& \operatorname{chord}(\theta) = 120\sin\left(\frac{\theta^\circ} 2 \right) \\
= {} & 60 \cdot \left( 2 \sin\left(\frac{\pi\theta}{360} \text{ radians} \right) \right).
\end{align}$$

As θ goes from 0 to 180, the chord of a θ° arc goes from 0 to 120. For tiny arcs, the chord is to the arc angle in degrees as π is to 3, or more precisely, the ratio can be made as close as desired to π/3 ≈ 1.04719755 by making θ small enough. Thus, for the arc of 1/2°, the chord length is slightly more than the arc angle in degrees. As the arc increases, the ratio of the chord to the arc decreases. When the arc reaches 60°, the chord length is exactly equal to the number of degrees in the arc, i.e. chord 60° = 60. For arcs of more than 60°, the chord is less than the arc, until an arc of 180° is reached, when the chord is only 120.

The fractional parts of chord lengths were expressed in sexagesimal (base 60) numerals. For example, where the length of a chord subtended by a 112° arc is reported to be 99,29,5, it has a length of

$$99 + \frac{29}{60} + \frac{5}{60^2} = 99.4847\overline{2},$$

rounded to the nearest 1/60^{2}.

After the columns for the arc and the chord, a third column is labeled "sixtieths". For an arc of θ°, the entry in the "sixtieths" column is

$$\frac{\operatorname{chord} \left(\theta + \tfrac12^\circ \right) - \operatorname{chord} \left( \theta^\circ\right)}{30}.$$

This is the average number of sixtieths of a unit that must be added to chord(θ°) each time the angle increases by one minute of arc, between the entry for θ° and that for (θ + 1/2)°. Thus, it is used for linear interpolation. Glowatzki and Göttsche showed that Ptolemy must have calculated chords to five sexagesimal places in order to achieve the degree of accuracy found in the "sixtieths" column.

$$\begin{array}{|l|rrr|rrr|}
\hline
\text{arc}^\circ & \text{chord} & & & \text{sixtieths} & & \\
\hline
{}\,\,\,\,\,\,\,\,\,\, \tfrac12 &  0 & 31 & 25 & 0 \quad 1 & 2 & 50 \\
{}\,\,\,\,\,\,\, 1 & 1 & 2 & 50 & 0 \quad 1 & 2 & 50 \\
{}\,\,\,\,\,\,\, 1\tfrac12 & 1 & 34 & 15 & 0 \quad 1 & 2 & 50 \\
{}\,\,\,\,\,\,\, \vdots & \vdots & \vdots & \vdots & \vdots & \vdots & \vdots \\
109 & 97 & 41 & 38 & 0 \quad 0 & 36 & 23 \\
109\tfrac12 & 97 & 59 & 49 & 0 \quad 0 & 36 & 9 \\
110 & 98 & 17 & 54 & 0 \quad 0 & 35 & 56 \\
110\tfrac12 & 98 & 35 & 52 & 0 \quad 0 & 35 & 42\\
111 & 98 & 53 & 43 & 0 \quad 0 & 35 & 29 \\
111\tfrac12 & 99 & 11 & 27 & 0 \quad 0 & 35 & 15 \\
112 & 99 & 29 & 5 & 0 \quad 0 & 35 & 1\\
112\tfrac12 & 99 & 46 & 35 & 0 \quad 0 & 34 & 48 \\
113 & 100 & 3 & 59 & 0 \quad 0 & 34 & 34 \\
{}\,\,\,\,\,\,\, \vdots & \vdots & \vdots & \vdots & \vdots & \vdots & \vdots \\
179 & 119 & 59 & 44 & 0 \quad 0 & 0 & 25 \\
179\frac12 & 119 & 59 & 56 & 0 \quad 0 & 0 & 9 \\
180 & 120 & 0 & 0 & 0 \quad 0 & 0 & 0 \\
\hline
\end{array}$$

== How Ptolemy computed chords ==
Chapter 10 of Book I of the Almagest presents geometric theorems used for computing chords. Ptolemy used geometric reasoning based on Proposition 10 of Book XIII of Euclid's Elements to find the chords of 72° and 36°. That Proposition states that if an equilateral pentagon is inscribed in a circle, then the area of the square on the side of the pentagon equals the sum of the areas of the squares on the sides of the hexagon and the decagon inscribed in the same circle.

He used Ptolemy's theorem on quadrilaterals inscribed in a circle to derive formulas for the chord of a half-arc, the chord of the sum of two arcs, and the chord of a difference of two arcs. The theorem states that for a quadrilateral inscribed in a circle, the product of the lengths of the diagonals equals the sum of the products of the two pairs of lengths of opposite sides. The derivations of trigonometric identities rely on a cyclic quadrilateral in which one side is a diameter of the circle.

To find the chords of arcs of 1° and 1/2° he used approximations based on Aristarchus's inequality. The inequality states that for arcs α and β, if 0 < β < α < 90°, then

$$\frac{\sin \alpha}{\sin \beta} < \frac\alpha\beta < \frac{\tan\alpha}{\tan\beta}.$$

Ptolemy showed that for arcs of 1° and 1/2°, the approximations correctly give the first two sexagesimal places after the integer part.

=== Accuracy ===
Gerald J. Toomer in his translation of the Almagest gives seven entries where some manuscripts have scribal errors, changing one "digit" (one letter, see below). Glenn Elert has made a comparison between Ptolemy's values and the true values (120 times the sine of half the angle) and has found that the root mean square error is 0.000136. But much of this is simply due to rounding off to the nearest 1/3600, since this equals 0.0002777... There are nevertheless many entries where the last "digit" is off by 1 (too high or too low) from the best rounded value. Ptolemy's values are often too high by 1 in the last place, and more so towards the higher angles. The largest errors are about 0.0004, which still corresponds to an error of only 1 in the last sexagesimal digit.

== The numeral system and the appearance of the untranslated table ==
Lengths of arcs of the circle, in degrees, and the integer parts of chord lengths, were expressed in a base 10 numeral system that used 21 of the letters of the Greek alphabet with the meanings given in the following table, and a symbol, "∠′", that means 1/2 and a raised circle "○" that fills a blank space (effectively representing zero). Three of the letters, labeled "archaic" in the table below, had not been in use in the Greek language for some centuries before the Almagest was written, but were still in use as numerals and musical notes.

$$\begin{array}{|rlr|rlr|rlr|}
\hline
\alpha & \mathrm{alpha} &  1 & \iota & \mathrm{iota} & 10 & \rho & \mathrm{rho} & 100 \\
\beta & \mathrm{beta} & 2 & \kappa & \mathrm{kappa} & 20 & \sigma  & \mathrm{sigma} & 200 \\
\gamma & \mathrm{gamma} & 3 & \lambda & \mathrm{lambda} & 30 & \tau & \mathrm{tau} & 300 \\
\delta & \mathrm{delta} & 4 & \mu & \mathrm{mu} & 40 & \upsilon & \mathrm{upsilon} & 400 \\
\varepsilon & \mathrm{epsilon} & 5 & \nu & \mathrm{nu} & 50 & \varphi & \mathrm{phi} & 500 \\
\stigma & \mathrm{stigma\ (archaic)} & 6 & \xi & \mathrm{xi} & 60 & \chi & \mathrm{chi} & 600 \\
\zeta & \mathrm{zeta} & 7 & \omicron & \mathrm{omicron} & 70 & \psi & \mathrm{psi} & 700 \\
\eta & \mathrm{eta} & 8 & \pi & \mathrm{pi} & 80 & \omega & \mathrm{omega} & 800 \\
\theta & \mathrm{theta} & 9 & \koppa & \mathrm{koppa\ (archaic)} & 90 & \sampi & \mathrm{sampi\ (archaic)} & 900\\
\hline
\end{array}$$

Thus, for example, an arc of 143 1/2° is expressed as ρμγ∠′. (As the table only reaches 180°, the Greek numerals for 200 and above are not used.)

The fractional parts of chord lengths required great accuracy, and were given in sexagesimal notation in two columns in the table: The first column gives an integer multiple of 1/60, in the range 0–59, the second an integer multiple of 1/60^{2} = 1/3600, also in the range 0–59.

Thus in Heiberg's edition of the Almagest with the table of chords on pages 48–63, the beginning of the table, corresponding to arcs from 1/2° to 7 1/2°, looks like this:

$$\begin{array}{ccc} \pi\varepsilon\rho\iota\varphi\varepsilon\rho\varepsilon\iota\tilde\omega\nu & \varepsilon\overset{\text{'}}\upsilon\theta\varepsilon\iota\tilde\omega\nu & \overset{\text{‘}}\varepsilon\xi\eta\kappa\omicron\sigma\tau\tilde\omega\nu \\
\begin{array}{|l|} \hline \quad \angle' \\ \alpha \\  \alpha\;\angle' \\  \hline\beta \\  \beta\;\angle' \\  \gamma \\  \hline\gamma\;\angle' \\  \delta \\  \delta\;\angle' \\  \hline\varepsilon \\  \varepsilon\;\angle' \\  \stigma \\  \hline\stigma\;\angle' \\  \zeta \\  \zeta\;\angle' \\  \hline \end{array} & \begin{array}{|r|r|r|} \hline\circ & \lambda\alpha & \kappa\varepsilon \\  \alpha & \beta & \nu \\  \alpha & \lambda\delta & \iota\varepsilon \\  \hline \beta & \varepsilon & \mu \\  \beta & \lambda\zeta & \delta \\  \gamma & \eta & \kappa\eta \\  \hline \gamma & \lambda\theta & \nu\beta \\  \delta & \iota\alpha & \iota\stigma \\  \delta & \mu\beta & \mu \\  \hline \varepsilon & \iota\delta & \delta \\  \varepsilon & \mu\varepsilon & \kappa\zeta \\  \stigma & \iota\stigma & \mu\theta \\  \hline \stigma & \mu\eta & \iota\alpha \\  \zeta & \iota\theta & \lambda\gamma \\  \zeta & \nu & \nu\delta \\  \hline \end{array} & \begin{array}{|r|r|r|r|} \hline \circ & \alpha & \beta & \nu \\  \circ & \alpha & \beta & \nu \\  \circ & \alpha & \beta & \nu \\  \hline \circ & \alpha & \beta & \nu \\  \circ & \alpha & \beta & \mu\eta \\  \circ & \alpha & \beta & \mu\eta \\  \hline\circ & \alpha & \beta & \mu\eta \\  \circ & \alpha & \beta & \mu\zeta \\  \circ & \alpha & \beta & \mu\zeta \\  \hline \circ & \alpha & \beta & \mu\stigma \\  \circ & \alpha & \beta & \mu\varepsilon \\  \circ & \alpha & \beta & \mu\delta \\  \hline \circ & \alpha & \beta & \mu\gamma \\  \circ & \alpha & \beta & \mu\beta \\  \circ & \alpha & \beta & \mu\alpha \\  \hline \end{array}
\end{array}$$

Later in the table, one can see the base-10 nature of the numerals expressing the integer parts of the arc and the chord length. Thus an arc of 85° is written as πε (π for 80 and ε for 5) and not broken down into 60 + 25. The corresponding chord length is 81 plus a fractional part. The integer part begins with πα, likewise not broken into 60 + 21. But the fractional part, $\tfrac4{60} + \tfrac{15}{60^2}$, is written as δ, for 4, in the 1/60 column, followed by ιε, for 15, in the 1/60^{2} column.

$$\begin{array}{ccc} \pi\varepsilon\rho\iota\varphi\varepsilon\rho\varepsilon\iota\tilde\omega\nu & \varepsilon\overset{\text{'}}\upsilon\theta\varepsilon\iota\tilde\omega\nu & \overset{\text{‘}}\varepsilon\xi\eta\kappa\omicron\sigma\tau\tilde\omega\nu \\
\begin{array}{|l|} \hline \pi\delta\angle' \\  \pi\varepsilon \\  \pi\varepsilon\angle' \\  \hline  \pi\stigma \\  \pi\stigma\angle' \\  \pi\zeta \\  \hline \end{array} & \begin{array}{|r|r|r|} \hline \pi & \mu\alpha & \gamma \\  \pi\alpha & \delta & \iota\varepsilon \\  \pi\alpha & \kappa\zeta & \kappa\beta \\  \hline \pi\alpha & \nu & \kappa\delta \\  \pi\beta & \iota\gamma & \iota\theta \\  \pi\beta & \lambda\stigma & \theta \\  \hline \end{array} & \begin{array}{|r|r|r|r|} \hline \circ & \circ & \mu\stigma & \kappa\varepsilon \\  \circ & \circ & \mu\stigma & \iota\delta \\  \circ & \circ & \mu\stigma & \gamma \\  \hline \circ & \circ & \mu\varepsilon & \nu\beta \\  \circ & \circ & \mu\varepsilon & \mu \\  \circ & \circ & \mu\varepsilon & \kappa\theta \\  \hline \end{array}
\end{array}$$

The table has 45 lines on each of eight pages, for a total of 360 lines.

== See also ==
- Aryabhata's sine table
- Exsecant
- Fundamentum Astronomiae, a book setting forth an algorithm for precise computation of sines, published in the late 1500s
- Greek mathematics
- Madhava's sine table
- Ptolemy
- Scale of chords
- Versine
