= Binary angular measurement =

Measure of angles

Binary angular measurement (BAM) (and the binary angular measurement system, BAMS) is a measure of angles using binary numbers and fixed-point arithmetic, in which a full turn is represented by the value 1.

These representation of angles are often used in numerical control and digital signal processing applications, such as robotics, navigation, computer games, and digital sensors, taking advantage of the implicit modular reduction achieved by truncating binary numbers. It may also be used as the fractional part of a fixed-point number counting the number of full rotations of e.g. a vehicle's wheels or a leadscrew.

== Representation ==
=== Unsigned fraction of turn ===
In this system, an angle is represented by an n-bit unsigned binary number in the sequence 0, ..., 2^{n}−1 that is interpreted as a multiple of 1/2^{n} of a full turn; that is, 360/2^{n} degrees or 2π/2^{n} radians. The number can also be interpreted as a fraction of a full turn between 0 (inclusive) and 1 (exclusive) represented in binary fixed-point format with a scaling factor of 1/2^{n}. Multiplying that fraction by 360° or 2π gives the angle in degrees in the range 0 to 360, or in radians, in the range 0 to 2π, respectively.

For example, with n = 8, the binary integers 00000000_{2} (0.00), 01000000_{2} (0.25), 10000000_{2} (0.50), and 11000000_{2} (0.75) represent the angular measures 0°, 90°, 180°, and 270°, respectively.

The main advantage of this system is that the addition or subtraction of the integer numeric values with the n-bit arithmetic used in most computers produces results that are consistent with the geometry of angles. Namely, the integer result of the operation is automatically reduced modulo 2^{n}, matching the fact that angles that differ by an integer number of full turns are equivalent. Thus one does not need to explicitly test or handle the wrap-around, as one must do when using other representations (such as number of degrees or radians in floating-point).

For n = 16, the unit of measure equal to 1/65,536 of a circle is sometimes called a Furman, after Alan T. Furman, the American mathematician who adapted the CORDIC algorithm for 16-bit fixed-point arithmetic sometime around 1980. It is slightly less than 20 arcseconds.

=== Signed fraction of turn ===
Signed binary angle measurement. Black is traditional degrees representation, green is a BAM as a decimal number and red is hexadecimal 32-bit BAM. In this figure the 32-bit binary integers are interpreted as signed binary fixed-point values with scaling factor 2^{−31}, representing fractions between −1.0 (inclusive) and +1.0 (exclusive).

Alternatively, the same n bits can also be interpreted as a signed integer in the range −2^{n−1}, ..., 2^{n−1}−1 in the two's complement convention. They can also be interpreted as a fraction of a full turn between −0.5 (inclusive) and +0.5 (exclusive) in signed fixed-point format, with the same scaling factor; or a fraction of half-turn between −1.0 (inclusive) and +1.0 (exclusive) with scaling factor 1/2^{n−1}.

Either way, these numbers can then be interpreted as angles between −180° (inclusive) and +180° (exclusive), with −0.25 meaning −90° and +0.25 meaning +90°. The result of adding or subtracting the numerical values will have the same sign as the result of adding or subtracting angles, once reduced to this range. This interpretation eliminates the need to reduce angles to the range [−π, +π] when computing trigonometric functions.

== Example ==
In the orbital data broadcast by the Global Positioning System, angles are encoded using binary angular measurement. In particular, each satellite broadcasts an ephemeris containing its six Keplerian orbital elements. Four of these are angles, which are encoded as 32-bit binary angles. In the lower-precision almanac data, 24-bit binary angles are used.

== See also ==
- Grade, 1/400 of a full turn
- Binary scaling
- CORDIC, algorithms for trigonometric functions
- Constructible polygon, including all polygons with 2^{n} sides
