= Half-turn =

A half-turn may refer to:

- One half of a full turn, an angle measure equivalent to 180 degrees or π radians
  - Considering only points in a plane, a half turn is equivalent to a point reflection
  - Pi (π), a mathematical constant representing a half-turn in radians
- A U-turn: a driving maneuver used to reverse direction
