= Gradian =

Unit of measurement of an angle, equal to 1/400th of a circle

gon
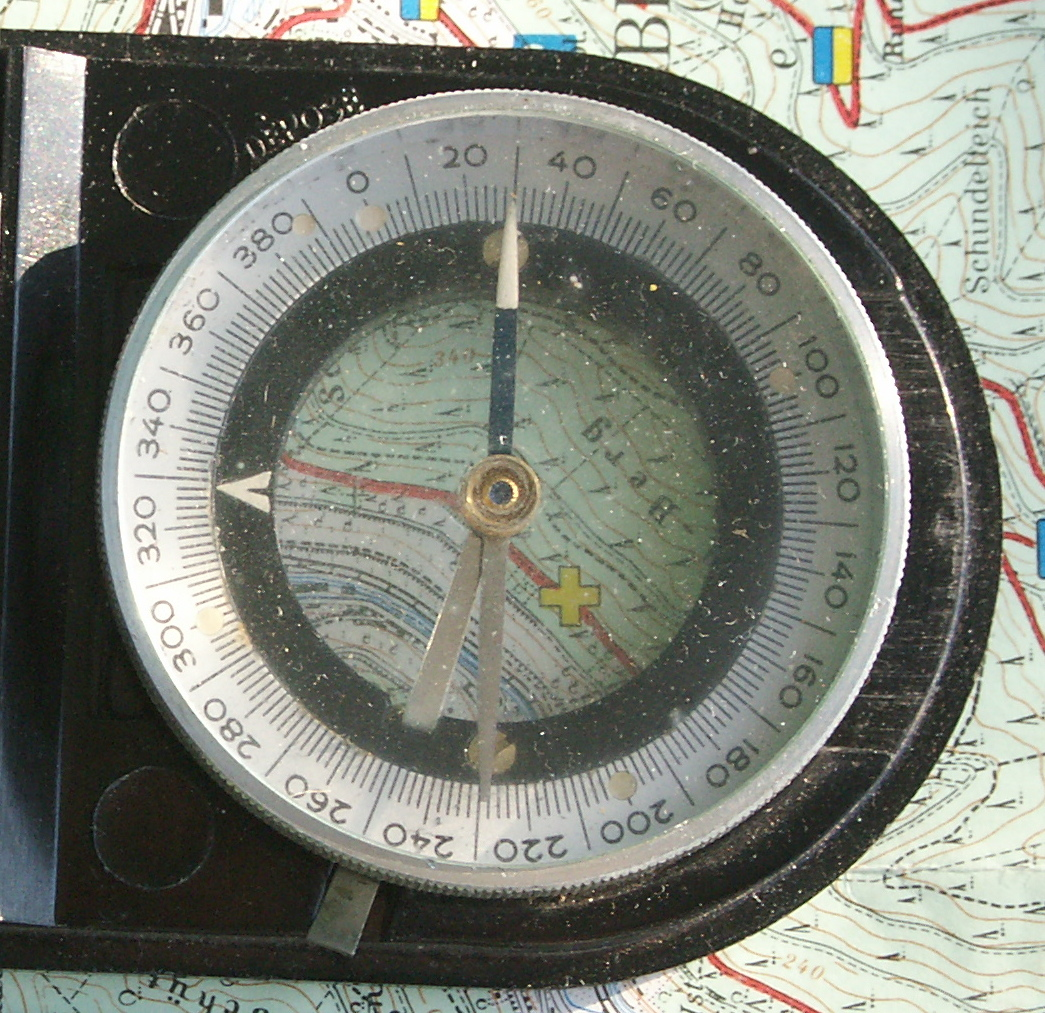
- Compass graded with 400 gon

General information
- Unit of: Angle
- Symbol: gon, ᵍ, grad

Conversions
1 gon in ...	... is equal to ...
- turns: 1/400 turn
- radians: π/200 rad ≈ 0.0157... rad
- milliradians: 5π mrad ≈ 15.71... mrad
- degrees: 0.9°
- minutes of arc: 54′

In trigonometry, the gradian – also known as the gon (from Ancient Greek γωνία (gōnía) 'angle'), grad, or grade – is a unit of measurement of an angle, defined as one-hundredth of the right angle; in other words, 100 gradians is equal to 90 degrees. It is equivalent to 1/400 of a turn, 9/10 of a degree, or π/200 of a radian. Measuring angles in gradians (gons) is said to employ the centesimal system of angular measurement, initiated as part of metrication and decimalisation efforts. (Note: On rare occasions, centesimal refers to the division of the full angle (360°) into hundred parts. One example is the description of the gradations on Georg Ohm's torsion balance in a history of physics book from 1899. The gradations were in one-hundredths of a full revolution.)

In continental Europe, the French word centigrade, also known as centesimal minute of arc, was in use for one hundredth of a grade; similarly, the centesimal second of arc was defined as one hundredth of a centesimal arc-minute, analogous to decimal time and the sexagesimal minutes and seconds of arc. The chance of confusion was one reason for the adoption of the term Celsius to replace centigrade as the name of the temperature scale.

Gradians (gons) are principally used in surveying (especially in Europe), and to a lesser extent in mining and geology.

The gon (gradian) is a legally recognised unit of measurement in the European Union and in Switzerland. However, this unit is not part of the International System of Units (SI).

== History and name ==
The unit originated in France in connection with the French Revolution as the grade, along with the metric system, hence it is occasionally referred to as a metric degree. Due to confusion with the existing term grad(e) in some northern European countries (meaning a standard degree, 1/360 of a turn), the name gon was later adopted, first in those regions, and later as the international standard. In France, it was also called grade nouveau. In German, the unit was formerly also called Neugrad (new degree) (whereas the standard degree was referred to as Altgrad (old degree)), likewise nygrad in Danish, Swedish and Norwegian (also gradian), and nýgráða in Icelandic.

Although attempts at a general introduction were made, the unit was only adopted in some countries, and for specialised areas such as surveying, mining and geology. Today, the degree, 1/360 of a turn, or the mathematically more convenient radian, 1/2π of a turn (used in the SI system of units) is generally used instead.

In the 1970s –1990s, most scientific calculators offered the gon (gradian), as well as radians and degrees, for their trigonometric functions. In the 2010s, some scientific calculators lack support for gradians.

=== Symbol ===
◌ᵍo

Gon
- In Unicode: U+1D4D ᵍ MODIFIER LETTER SMALL G

Related
- See also: U+00B0 ° DEGREE SIGN

The international standard symbol for this unit is "gon" (see ISO 31-1, Annex B). Other symbols used in the past include "gr", "grd", and "g", the last sometimes written as a superscript, similarly to a degree sign: 50^{g} = 45°. A metric prefix is sometimes used, as in "dgon", "cgon", "mgon", denoting respectively 0.1 gon, 0.01 gon, 0.001 gon. Centesimal arc-minutes and centesimal arc-seconds were also denoted with superscripts ^{c} and ^{cc}, respectively.

SI multiples of gon (gon)
Submultiples			Multiples		
Value	SI symbol	Name	Value	SI symbol	Name
10^{−1} gon	dgon	decigon	10^{1} gon	dagon	decagon
10^{−2} gon	cgon	centigon	10^{2} gon	hgon	hectogon
10^{−3} gon	mgon	milligon	10^{3} gon	kgon	kilogon
10^{−6} gon	μgon	microgon	10^{6} gon	Mgon	megagon
10^{−9} gon	ngon	nanogon	10^{9} gon	Ggon	gigagon
10^{−12} gon	pgon	picogon	10^{12} gon	Tgon	teragon
10^{−15} gon	fgon	femtogon	10^{15} gon	Pgon	petagon
10^{−18} gon	agon	attogon	10^{18} gon	Egon	exagon
10^{−21} gon	zgon	zeptogon	10^{21} gon	Zgon	zettagon
10^{−24} gon	ygon	yoctogon	10^{24} gon	Ygon	yottagon
10^{−27} gon	rgon	rontogon	10^{27} gon	Rgon	ronnagon
10^{−30} gon	qgon	quectogon	10^{30} gon	Qgon	quettagon

== Advantages and disadvantages ==
Each quadrant is assigned a range of 100 gon, which eases recognition of the four quadrants, as well as arithmetic involving perpendicular or opposite angles.

0°	=	0 gradians
90°	=	100 gradians
180°	=	200 gradians
270°	=	300 gradians
360°	=	400 gradians

One advantage of this unit is that right angles to a given angle are easily determined. If one is sighting down a compass course of 117 gon, the direction to one's left is 17 gon, to one's right 217 gon, and behind one 317 gon. A disadvantage is that the common angles of 30° and 60° in geometry must be expressed in fractions (as 33 1/3 gon and 66 2/3 gon respectively).

== Conversion ==
Conversion of common angles
Turns	Radians	Degrees	Gradians
0 turn	0 rad	0°	0^{g}
1/72 turn	π/36 or 𝜏/72 rad	5°	5 5/9^{g}
1/24 turn	π/12 or 𝜏/24 rad	15°	16 2/3^{g}
1/16 turn	π/8 or 𝜏/16 rad	22.5°	25^{g}
1/12 turn	π/6 or 𝜏/12 rad	30°	33 1/3^{g}
1/10 turn	π/5 or 𝜏/10 rad	36°	40^{g}
1/8 turn	π/4 or 𝜏/8 rad	45°	50^{g}
1/(2π or 𝜏) turn	1 rad	approx. 57.3°	approx. 63.7^{g}
1/6 turn	π/3 or 𝜏/6 rad	60°	66 2/3^{g}
1/5 turn	(2π or 𝜏)/5 rad	72°	80^{g}
1/4 turn	π/2 or 𝜏/4 rad	90°	100^{g}
1/3 turn	(2π or 𝜏)/3 rad	120°	133 1/3^{g}
2/5 turn	(4π or 2𝜏 or α)/5 rad	144°	160^{g}
1/2 turn	π or 𝜏/2 rad	180°	200^{g}
3/4 turn	(3π or ρ)/2 or 3𝜏/4 rad	270°	300^{g}
1 turn	𝜏 or 2π rad	360°	400^{g}

== Relation to the metre ==
An early definition of the metre was one ten-millionth of the distance from the North Pole to the equator, measured along a meridian through Paris.

In the eighteenth century, the metre was defined as the 10-millionth part of a quarter meridian. Thus, 1 gon corresponds to an arc length along the Earth's surface of approximately 100 kilometres; 1 centigon to 1 kilometre; 10 microgons to 1 metre. (The metre has been redefined with increasing precision since then.)

== Relation to the SI system of units ==
The gradian is not part of the International System of Units (SI). The EU directive on the units of measurement notes that the gradian "does not appear in the lists drawn up by the CGPM, CIPM or BIPM." The most recent, 9th edition of the SI Brochure does not mention the gradian at all. The previous edition mentioned it only in the following footnote:

The gon (or grad, where grad is an alternative name for the gon) is an alternative unit of plane angle to the degree, defined as (π/200) rad. Thus there are 100 gon in a right angle. The potential value of the gon in navigation is that because the distance from the pole to the equator of the Earth is approximately 10000 km, 1 km on the surface of the Earth subtends an angle of one centigon at the centre of the Earth. However the gon is rarely used.

== See also ==
- Angular frequency – Rate of change of angle
- Milliradian – Angular measurement, thousandth of a radian (primarily military use)
- Harmonic analysis – Area of mathematical analysis
- Jean-Charles de Borda – French scientist and Navy officer (1733–1799)
- Repeating circle – Type of angular measurement instrument
- Spread (rational trigonometry) – 2005 book reformulating plane geometry
- Steradian – SI derived unit of solid angle (the "square radian")
