= Degree (angle) =

Unit of plane angle where a full circle equals 360°

degree
- One degree (shown in red) and eighty nine degrees (shown in blue). The lined area is a right angle.

General information
- Unit system: Non-SI metric unit
- Unit of: Angle
- Symbol: °, deg

Conversions
1° in ...	... is equal to ...
- turns: 1/360 turn
- radians: π/180 rad ≈ 0.01745... rad
- milliradians: 50π/9 mrad ≈ 17.45... mrad
- gradians: 10/9^{g}
- arcminutes: 60′
- arcseconds: 3600″

A degree (in full, a degree of arc, arc degree, or arcdegree), usually denoted by ° (the degree symbol), is a unit of measurement of a plane angle in which one full rotation is assigned the value of 360 degrees. The unit of angular measure in the International System of Units (SI) is the radian, and one degree is equivalent to π/180 radians.

== History ==
A circle with an equilateral chord (red). One sixtieth of this arc is a degree. Six such chords complete the circle.

The original motivation for choosing the degree as a unit of rotations and angles is unknown. One theory states that it is related to the fact that 360 is approximately the number of days in a year. Ancient astronomers noticed that the sun, which follows through the ecliptic path over the course of the year, seems to advance in its path by approximately one degree each day. Some ancient calendars, such as the Persian calendar and the Babylonian calendar, used 360 days for a year. The use of a calendar with 360 days may be related to the use of sexagesimal numbers.

Another theory is that the Babylonians subdivided the circle using the angle of an equilateral triangle as the basic unit, and further subdivided the latter into 60 parts following their sexagesimal numeric system. The earliest trigonometry, used by the Babylonian astronomers and their Greek successors, was based on chords of a circle. A chord of length equal to the radius made a natural base quantity. One sixtieth of this, using their standard sexagesimal divisions, was a degree.

Aristarchus of Samos and Hipparchus seem to have been among the first Greek scientists to exploit Babylonian astronomical knowledge and techniques systematically. Timocharis, Aristarchus, Aristillus, Archimedes, and Hipparchus were the first Greeks known to divide the circle in 360 degrees of 60 arc minutes. Eratosthenes used a simpler sexagesimal system dividing a circle into 60 parts.

Another motivation for choosing the number 360 may have been that it is readily divisible: 360 has 24 divisors, (Note: The divisors of 360 are 1, 2, 3, 4, 5, 6, 8, 9, 10, 12, 15, 18, 20, 24, 30, 36, 40, 45, 60, 72, 90, 120, 180, and 360.) making it one of only 7 numbers such that no number less than twice as much has more divisors (sequence A02182 in the OEIS). Furthermore, it is divisible by every number from 1 to 10 except 7. (Note: Contrast this with the relatively unwieldy 2520, which is the least common multiple for every number from 1 to 10.) This property has many useful applications, such as dividing the world into 24 time zones, each of which is nominally 15° of longitude, to correlate with the established 24-hour day convention.

Finally, it may be the case that more than one of these factors has come into play. According to that theory, the number is approximately 365 because of the apparent movement of the sun against the celestial sphere, and that it was rounded to 360 for some of the mathematical reasons cited above.

== Subdivisions ==
For many practical purposes, a degree is a small enough angle that whole degrees provide sufficient precision. When this is not the case, as in astronomy or for geographic coordinates (latitude and longitude), degree measurements may be written using decimal degrees (DD notation); for example, 40.1875°.

Alternatively, the traditional sexagesimal unit subdivisions can be used: one degree is divided into 60 minutes (of arc), and one minute into 60 seconds (of arc). Use of degrees-minutes-seconds is also called DMS notation. These subdivisions, also called the arcminute and arcsecond, are represented by a single prime (′) and double prime (″) respectively. For example, 40.1875° = 40° 11′ 15″. Additional precision can be provided using decimal fractions of an arcsecond.

Maritime charts are marked in degrees and decimal minutes to facilitate measurement; 1 minute of latitude is 1 nautical mile. The example above would be given as 40° 11.25′.

The older system of thirds, fourths, etc., which continues the sexagesimal unit subdivision, was used by al-Kashi and other ancient astronomers, but is rarely used today. These subdivisions were denoted by writing the Roman numeral for the number of sixtieths in superscript: 1^{I} for a "prime" (minute of arc), 1^{II} for a second, 1^{III} for a third, 1^{IV} for a fourth, etc. Hence, the modern symbols for the minute and second of arc, and the word "second" also refer to this system.

SI prefixes can also be applied to the degree, as in millidegree, microdegree, etc.

== Alternative units ==
A chart to convert between degrees and radians

In most mathematical work beyond practical geometry, angles are typically measured in radians rather than degrees. This is for a variety of reasons; for example, the trigonometric functions have simpler and more "natural" properties when their arguments are expressed in radians. These considerations outweigh the convenient divisibility of the number 360. One complete turn (360°) is equal to 2π radians, so 180° is equal to π radians, or equivalently, the degree is a mathematical constant: 1° = π/180.

One turn (corresponding to a cycle or revolution) is equal to 360°.

With the invention of the metric system, based on powers of ten, there was an attempt to replace degrees by decimal "degrees" in France and nearby countries, (Note: These new and decimal "degrees" must not be confused with decimal degrees.) where the number in a right angle is equal to 100 gon with 400 gon in a full circle (1° = 10/9 gon). This was called grade (nouveau) or grad. Due to confusion with the existing term grad(e) in some northern European countries (meaning a standard degree, 1/360 of a turn), the new unit was called Neugrad in German (whereas the "old" degree was referred to as Altgrad), likewise nygrad in Danish, Swedish and Norwegian (also gradian), and nýgráða in Icelandic. To end the confusion, the name gon was later adopted for the new unit. Although this idea of metrification was abandoned by Napoleon, grades continued to be used in several fields and many scientific calculators support them. Decigrades (1/4000) were used with French artillery sights in World War I.

An angular mil, which is most used in military applications, has at least three specific variants, ranging from 1/6400 to 1/6000. It is approximately equal to one milliradian (c. 1/6,283). A mil measuring 1/6000 of a revolution originated in the imperial Russian army, where an equilateral chord was divided into tenths to give a circle of 600 units. This may be seen on a lining plane (an early device for aiming indirect fire artillery) dating from about 1900 in the St. Petersburg Museum of Artillery.

Conversion of common angles
Turns	Radians	Degrees	Gradians
0 turn	0 rad	0°	0^{g}
1/72 turn	π/36 or 𝜏/72 rad	5°	5 5/9^{g}
1/24 turn	π/12 or 𝜏/24 rad	15°	16 2/3^{g}
1/16 turn	π/8 or 𝜏/16 rad	22.5°	25^{g}
1/12 turn	π/6 or 𝜏/12 rad	30°	33 1/3^{g}
1/10 turn	π/5 or 𝜏/10 rad	36°	40^{g}
1/8 turn	π/4 or 𝜏/8 rad	45°	50^{g}
1/(2π or 𝜏) turn	1 rad	approx. 57.3°	approx. 63.7^{g}
1/6 turn	π/3 or 𝜏/6 rad	60°	66 2/3^{g}
1/5 turn	(2π or 𝜏)/5 rad	72°	80^{g}
1/4 turn	π/2 or 𝜏/4 rad	90°	100^{g}
1/3 turn	(2π or 𝜏)/3 rad	120°	133 1/3^{g}
2/5 turn	(4π or 2𝜏 or α)/5 rad	144°	160^{g}
1/2 turn	π or 𝜏/2 rad	180°	200^{g}
3/4 turn	(3π or ρ)/2 or 3𝜏/4 rad	270°	300^{g}
1 turn	𝜏 or 2π rad	360°	400^{g}

== See also ==
- Compass
- Degree of curvature
- Degrees per second
- Geographic coordinate system
- Gradian
- Meridian arc
- Square degree
- Square minute or second
- Steradian
