= Turn (angle) =

Unit of plane angle where a full circle equals 1

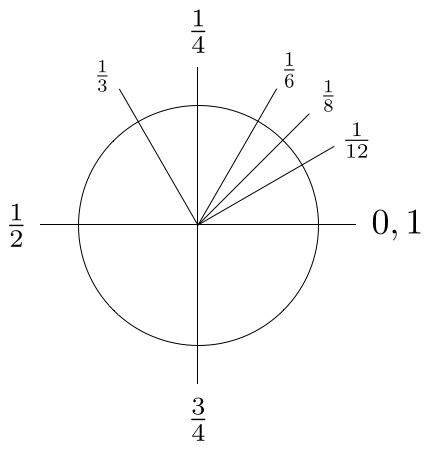
- Counterclockwise rotations about the center point starting from the right, where a complete rotation corresponds to an angle of rotation of 1 turn.

General information
- Unit of: Plane angle
- Symbol: tr, pla, rev, cyc

Conversions
1 tr in ...	... is equal to ...
- radians: 2π rad ≈ 6.283185307... rad
- milliradians: 2000π mrad ≈ 6283.185307... mrad
- degrees: 360°
- gradians: 400^{g}

The turn (symbol tr or pla) is a unit of plane angle measurement that is the measure of a complete angle—the angle subtended by a complete circle at its center. One turn is equal to 2π radians, 360 degrees or 400 gradians. As an angular unit, one turn also corresponds to one cycle (symbol cyc or c) or to one revolution (symbol rev or r). Common related units of frequency are cycles per second (cps) and revolutions per minute (rpm). The angular unit of the turn is useful in connection with, among other things, electromagnetic coils (e.g., transformers), rotating objects, and the winding number of curves. Divisions of a turn include the half-turn and quarter-turn, spanning a straight angle and a right angle, respectively; metric prefixes can also be used as in, e.g., centiturns (ctr), milliturns (mtr), etc.

In the ISQ, an arbitrary "number of turns" (also known as "number of revolutions" or "number of cycles") is formalized as a dimensionless quantity called rotation, defined as the ratio of a given angle and a full turn. It is represented by the symbol N.

Because one turn is $2\pi$ radians, some have proposed representing $2\pi$ with the single letter 𝜏 (tau).

== Unit symbols ==
There are several unit symbols for the turn.

=== EU and Switzerland ===
The German standard DIN 1315 (March 1974) proposed the unit symbol "pla" (from Latin: plenus angulus 'full angle') for turns. Covered in DIN 1301-1 (October 2010), the so-called Vollwinkel ('full angle') is not an SI unit. However, it is a legal unit of measurement in the EU and Switzerland.

=== Calculators ===
The scientific calculators HP 39gII and HP Prime support the unit symbol "tr" for turns since 2011 and 2013, respectively. Support for "tr" was also added to newRPL for the HP 50g in 2016, and for the hp 39g+, HP 49g+, HP 39gs, and HP 40gs in 2017. An angular mode TURN was suggested for the WP 43S as well, but the calculator instead implements "MULπ" (multiples of π) as mode and unit since 2019.

== Divisions ==
Many angle units are defined as a division of the turn. For example, the degree is defined such that one turn is 360 degrees.

Using metric prefixes, the turn can be divided in 100 centiturns or 1000 milliturns, with each milliturn corresponding to an angle of 0.36°, which can also be written as 21′ 36″. A protractor divided in centiturns is normally called a "percentage protractor". While percentage protractors have existed since 1922, the terms centiturns, milliturns and microturns were introduced much later by the British astronomer Fred Hoyle in 1962. Some measurement devices for artillery and satellite watching carry milliturn scales.

Binary fractions of a turn are also used. Sailors have traditionally divided a turn into 32 compass points, which implicitly have an angular separation of 1/32 turn. The binary degree, also known as the binary radian (or brad), is 1/256 turn. The binary degree is used in computing so that an angle can be represented to the maximum possible precision in a single byte. Other measures of angle used in computing may be based on dividing one whole turn into 2^{n} equal parts for other values of n.

== Unit conversion ==
The circumference of the unit circle (whose radius is one) is 2π.

One turn is equal to $2\pi$ = $\tau$ ≈ 6.283185307179586 radians, 360 degrees, or 400 gradians.

Conversion of common angles
Turns	Radians		Degrees	Gradians
0 turn	0 rad		0°	0^{g}
1/72 turn	𝜏/72 rad	π/36 rad	5°	5 5/9^{g}
1/24 turn	𝜏/24 rad	π/12 rad	15°	16 2/3^{g}
1/16 turn	𝜏/16 rad	π/8 rad	22.5°	25^{g}
1/12 turn	𝜏/12 rad	π/6 rad	30°	33 1/3^{g}
1/10 turn	𝜏/10 rad	π/5 rad	36°	40^{g}
1/8 turn	𝜏/8 rad	π/4 rad	45°	50^{g}
1/2π turn	1 rad		c. 57.3°	c. 63.7^{g}
1/6 turn	𝜏/6 rad	π/3 rad	60°	66 2/3^{g}
1/5 turn	𝜏/5 rad	2π/5 rad	72°	80^{g}
1/4 turn	𝜏/4 rad	π/2 rad	90°	100^{g}
1/3 turn	𝜏/3 rad	2π/3 rad	120°	133 1/3^{g}
2/5 turn	2𝜏/5 rad	4π/5 rad	144°	160^{g}
1/2 turn	𝜏/2 rad	π rad	180°	200^{g}
3/4 turn	3𝜏/4 rad	3π/2 rad	270°	300^{g}
1 turn	𝜏 rad	2π rad	360°	400^{g}

== In the ISQ/SI ==
Rotation
- Other names: number of revolutions, number of cycles, number of turns, number of rotations
- Common symbols: N
- SI unit: Unitless
- Dimension: 1

In the International System of Quantities (ISQ), rotation (symbol N) is a physical quantity defined as number of revolutions:

N is the number (not necessarily an integer) of revolutions, for example, of a rotating body about a given axis. Its value is given by:

$$N = \frac{\varphi}{2 \pi \text{ rad}}$$

where 𝜑 denotes the measure of rotational displacement.

The above definition is part of the ISQ, formalized in the international standard ISO 80000-3 (Space and time), and adopted in the International System of Units (SI).

Rotation count or number of revolutions is a quantity of dimension one, resulting from a ratio of angular displacement. It can be negative and also greater than 1 in modulus. The relationship between quantity rotation, N, and unit turns, tr, can be expressed as:

$$N = \frac \varphi \text{tr} = \{ \varphi \}_\text{tr}$$

where {𝜑}_{tr} is the numerical value of the angle 𝜑 in units of turns (see Physical quantity § Components).

In the ISQ/SI, rotation is used to derive rotational frequency (the rate of change of rotation with respect to time), denoted by n:

$$n = \frac{\mathrm{d}N}{\mathrm{d}t}$$

The SI unit of rotational frequency is the reciprocal second (s^{−1}). Common related units of frequency are hertz (Hz), cycles per second (cps), and revolutions per minute (rpm).

Revolution
- Unit of: Rotation
- Symbol: rev, r, cyc, c

Conversions
1 rev in ...	... is equal to ...
- Base units: 1

The superseded version ISO 80000-3:2006 defined "revolution" as a special name for the dimensionless unit "one", (Note: "The special name revolution, symbol r, for this unit [name 'one', symbol '1'] is widely used in specifications on rotating machines.") which also received other special names, such as the radian. (Note: "Measurement units of quantities of dimension one are numbers. In some cases, these measurement units are given special names, e.g. radian...") Despite their dimensional homogeneity, these two specially named dimensionless units are applicable for non-comparable kinds of quantity: rotation and angle, respectively. "Cycle" is also mentioned in ISO 80000-3, in the definition of period. (Note: "3-14) period duration, period: duration (item 3‑9) of one cycle of a periodic event")

== See also ==
- Ampere-turn
- Hertz (modern) or Cycle per second (older)
- Angle of rotation
- Revolutions per minute
- Repeating circle
- Spat (angular unit) – the solid angle counterpart of the turn, equivalent to 4π steradians.
- Unit interval
- Divine Proportions: Rational Trigonometry to Universal Geometry
- Modulo operation
- Tau (mathematics)
