= Succinylornithine aminotransferase =

Succinylornithine aminotransferase may refer to:

- Succinylornithine transaminase, enzyme
- Acetylornithine transaminase, enzyme
