= ASTC =

ASTC may refer to:

- Association of Science-Technology Centers, an international organization of science centers and science museums
- American Society of Theatre Consultants, a professional organization whose main goal is to apprise owners, contractors and/or architects of the services that a theatre consultant can perform, whether it be for a new or renovated facility
- Antonov ASTC (Antonov Aeronautical Scientific/Technical Complex), a Ukraine-based aircraft manufacturing and services company
- All Students Take Calculus, a mathematical mnemonic
- Active Skid and Traction Control, the brand name of Mitsubishi Motors' electronic stability control system
- ASX Settlement and Transfer Corporation, the operator of the Australian Clearing House and Electronic Sub-register System (CHESS)
- Alamo Scouts Training Center, the training camp and headquarters of the U.S. Sixth Army Special Reconnaissance
- Assam State Transport Corporation, the road transport authority of the state of Assam, India
- Alice Springs Town Council, the local council for the Central Australian township of Alice Springs, Northern Territory, Australia
- Adaptive Scalable Texture Compression, a lossy block-based texture compression algorithm
- Succinylornithine transaminase, an enzyme
- Arab Satellite Television Charter, calling for regulation of satellite television broadcasting in Arab countries
