= Regiomontanus' angle maximization problem =

Famous mathematical optimization problem

In mathematics, the Regiomontanus's angle maximization problem, is a famous optimization problem posed by the 15th-century German mathematician Johannes Müller (also known as Regiomontanus). The problem is as follows:

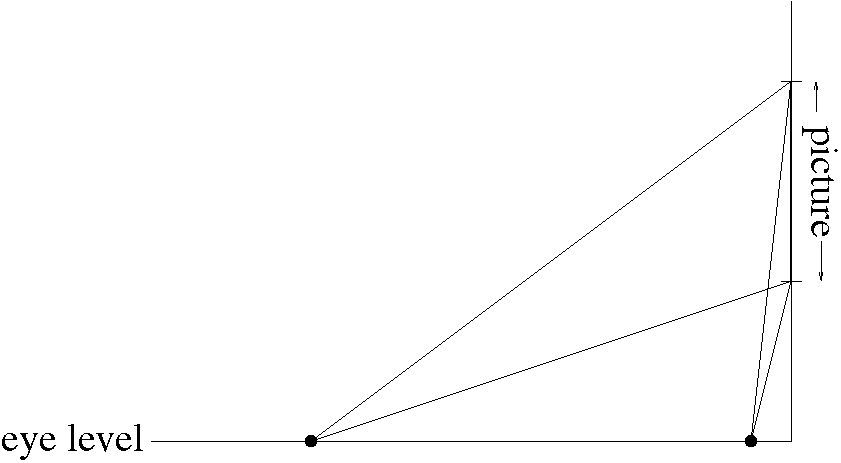
The two dots at eye level are possible locations of the viewer's eye.

A painting hangs from a wall. Given the heights of the top and bottom of the painting above the viewer's eye level, how far from the wall should the viewer stand in order to maximize the angle subtended by the painting and whose vertex is at the viewer's eye?

If the viewer stands too close to the wall or too far from the wall, the angle is small; somewhere in between it is as large as possible.

The same approach applies to finding the optimal place from which to kick a ball in rugby. For that matter, it is not necessary that the alignment of the picture be at right angles: we might be looking at a window of the Leaning Tower of Pisa or a realtor showing off the advantages of a sky-light in a sloping attic roof.

== Solution by elementary geometry ==
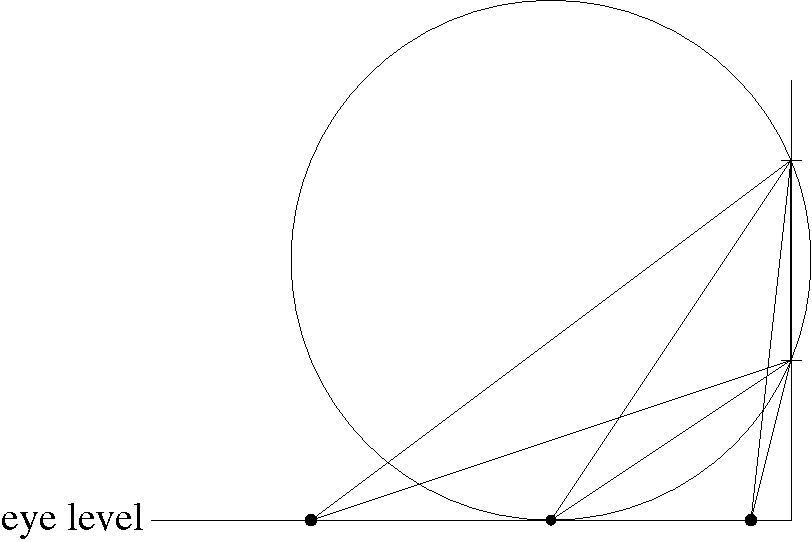

There is a unique circle passing through the top and bottom of the painting and tangent to the eye-level line. By elementary geometry, if the viewer's position were to move along the circle, the angle subtended by the painting would remain constant. All positions on the eye-level line except the point of tangency are outside of the circle, and therefore the angle subtended by the painting from those points is smaller.

The point of tangency can be constructed by the following steps:

- Reflect the bottom point of the painting across the line at eye-level.
- Construct the line segment between this reflected point and the top point of the painting.
- Draw the circle having this line segment as its diameter.
- The point of tangency is one of the two points where this circle crosses the line at eye-level (the one that is in front of the picture).

This can be shown to correctly construct the point of tangency by using Euclid's Elements, Book III, Proposition 36 (alternatively the power-of-a-point theorem) to show that the distance from the wall to the point of tangency is the geometric mean of the heights of the top and bottom of the painting. Equivalently, a square with this distance as its side length has the same area as a rectangle with the two heights as its sides. Then, the construction of a circle with the top of the painting diametrically opposite the reflected bottom, and its intersection with the line at eye level, follows Euclid's Book II, Proposition 14, which describes how to construct a square with the same area as a given rectangle.

== Solution by calculus ==
In the present day, this problem is widely known because it appears as an exercise in many first-year calculus textbooks (for example that of Stewart).

Let

a = the height of the bottom of the painting above eye level;
b = the height of the top of the painting above eye level;
x = the viewer's distance from the wall;
α = the angle of elevation of the bottom of the painting, seen from the viewer's position;
β = the angle of elevation of the top of the painting, seen from the viewer's position.

The angle we seek to maximize is β − α. The tangent of the angle increases as the angle increases; therefore it suffices to maximize

$$\tan(\beta - \alpha) = \frac{\tan\beta - \tan\alpha}{1 + \tan\beta\tan\alpha} = \frac{\dfrac{b}{x} - \dfrac{a}{x}}{1 + \dfrac{b}{x}\cdot\dfrac{a}{x}} = (b-a)\frac{x}{x^2 + ab}.$$

Since b − a is a positive constant, we only need to maximize the fraction that follows it. Differentiating, we get

$${d \over dx}\left(\frac{x}{x^2 + ab}\right) = \frac{ab - x^2}{(x^2 + ab)^2} \qquad \begin{cases} {} > 0 & \text{if } 0 \le x < \sqrt{ab\,{}}, \\ {} = 0 & \text{if } x = \sqrt{ab\,{}}, \\ {} < 0 & \text{if } x > \sqrt{ab\,{}}. \end{cases}$$

Therefore the angle increases as x goes from 0 to √ab and decreases as x increases from √ab. The angle is therefore as large as possible precisely when x = √ab, the geometric mean of a and b.

== Solution by algebra ==
We have seen that it suffices to maximize

$$\frac{x}{x^2 + ab}.$$

This is equivalent to minimizing the reciprocal:

$$\frac{x^2 + ab}{x} = x + \frac{ab}{x}.$$

Observe that this last quantity is equal to

$$\left( \sqrt{x} - \sqrt\frac{ab}{x}\, \right)^2 + 2\sqrt{ab\,{}}.$$

(Click "show" at right to see the algebraic details or "hide" to hide them.)
Recall that

$$(u-v)^2 = u^2 - 2uv + v^2.$$
Thus when we have u^{2} + v^{2}, we can add the middle term −2uv to get a perfect square. We have
$$x + \frac{ab}{x}.$$
If we regard x as u^{2} and ab/x as v^{2}, then u = √x and v = √ab/x, and so
$$2uv = 2\sqrt{x}\sqrt{\frac{ab}{x}} = 2\sqrt{ab\,{}}.$$
Thus we have
$$\begin{align}
x + \frac{ab}{x} & = u^2 + v^2 = \underbrace{\left(u^2 - 2uv + v^2\right)}_\text{a perfect square} + 2uv \\
& = (u - v)^2 + 2uv = \left( \sqrt{x} - \sqrt\frac{ab}{x}\, \right)^2 + 2\sqrt{ab\,{}}.
\end{align}$$

This is as small as possible precisely when the square is 0, and that happens when x = √ab. Alternatively, we might cite this as an instance of the inequality between the arithmetic and geometric means.
