= Acetylornithine transaminase =

Class of enzymes

Identifiers
- EC no.: 2.6.1.11
- CAS no.: 9030-40-4

Databases
- IntEnz: IntEnz view
- BRENDA: BRENDA entry
- ExPASy: NiceZyme view
- KEGG: KEGG entry
- MetaCyc: metabolic pathway
- PRIAM: profile
- PDB structures: RCSB PDB PDBe PDBsum
- Gene Ontology: AmiGO / QuickGO
Search
- PMC: articles
- PubMed: articles
- NCBI: proteins

Acetylornithine transaminase (EC 2.6.1.11) is an enzyme first characterised from Escherichia coli that catalyzes a reversible chemical reaction that is part of the biosynthesis of ornithine and arginine:

N(2)-acetyl-L-ornithine
+
α-ketoglutaric acid
N-acetyl-5-oxo-L-norvaline
+
L-glutamic acid

The two substrates of this enzyme in the forward direction shown are N(2)-acetyl-L-ornithine and α-ketoglutaric acid. Its products are N-acetyl-5-oxo-L-norvaline and L-glutamic acid. The enzyme has also been found in the genus Pseudomonas.

This enzyme is a transferase, specifically a transaminase, which transfer nitrogenous groups. The systematic name of this enzyme class is N2-acetyl-L-ornithine:2-oxoglutarate 5-aminotransferase. Other names in common use include acetylornithine delta-transaminase, ACOAT, acetylornithine 5-aminotransferase, acetylornithine aminotransferase, N-acetylornithine aminotransferase, N-acetylornithine-delta-transaminase, N2-acetylornithine 5-transaminase, N2-acetyl-L-ornithine:2-oxoglutarate aminotransferase, succinylornithine aminotransferase, and 2-N-acetyl-L-ornithine:2-oxoglutarate 5-aminotransferase. It uses pyridoxal phosphate as a cofactor.

== Structural studies ==
As of late 2007, 6 structures have been solved for this class of enzymes, with PDB accession codes 1VEF, 1WKG, 1WKH, 2E54, 2EH6, and 2ORD.
