= Dialing scales =

Method of calibrating sundials

Dialing scales are used to lay out the face of a sundial geometrically. They were proposed by Samuel Foster in 1638, and produced by George Serle and Anthony Thompson in 1658 on a ruler. There are two scales: the latitude scale and the hour scale. They can be used to draw all gnomonic dials – and reverse engineer existing dials to discover their original intended location.

== History ==
Dialing scales were first discussed by Samuel Foster in 1638. P. Pierre Bobynet, a Jesuit drew a scale in his book L'horographie ingenieuse contenant des Connoissances, & Curiositez Agréables dans la composition des Cadrans, in 1647. It was however George Serles 1657 book, Dialling Universal, printed by R & W Leybourn that brought them to popular attention. These scales remained virtually unchanged for 250 years. E. C. Middleton, who had been engraving dialling scales from about 1895, supplied dialling scales accompanied by a typewritten instruction book from Birmingham in 1913– these were the scales calculated by Serle. The North American Sundial Society has printed facsimiles of both the Serle and Middleton books. The Middleton dial appeared without explanation in the 1994 Encyclopedia de Diderot et Alembert (French). Further work has done on these rulers by F.W. Cousins, and by Fred W Sawyer from 1997–2009.

== Description ==
The traditional scales (Foster Serle scales) are drawn on a ruler. The hour scale shows $\sin t \over \sin t + \cos t$ and the latitude scale shows $\sin \varphi \over \sqrt {1+ \sin^2 \varphi}$. The graduation of these rulers is independent of latitude, making them suitable for drawing all dials. The Foster Serle dial is randomly set for a value of 45°, and is more precise for latitudes below 45°. It is thus a special case in an infinite set of rulers.

== Usage ==
A right-angle is drawn on the dial-face and the latitude scale is laid against the x-axis. The target latitude point is marked across on to the dial face. The hour scale is placed from this point to the noon line (conventionally, the zero point is on the noon line). Each of the hour points is copied over to the dial face, and this procedure is repeated, giving the hours both sides of noon. A straight edge is used to connect these points to the origin, thus drawing the hour lines for that location. A vertical line from the target latitude point, and a horizontal line through the noon point will bisect at the three-hour (9 am–3 pm) marker.

In the northern hemisphere the hours run clockwise. Symmetries about the noon line, the six-hour line and the three-hour marker can be detected – and these can be used to add additional lines.

The style will be at the same angle as the latitude. It can be simply drawn using the Line of Chords scale on the dialing ruler. A set of compasses is extended to the 60° point on the line of chords. A radius is drawn from the substyle. The compasses are set to the target latitude on the line of chords scale. This measurement is transferred along the radius. That angle represents the style height.

They can be used to draw all gnomonic dials – and reverse engineer existing dials to discover their original intended location.
