= Succinylornithine transaminase =

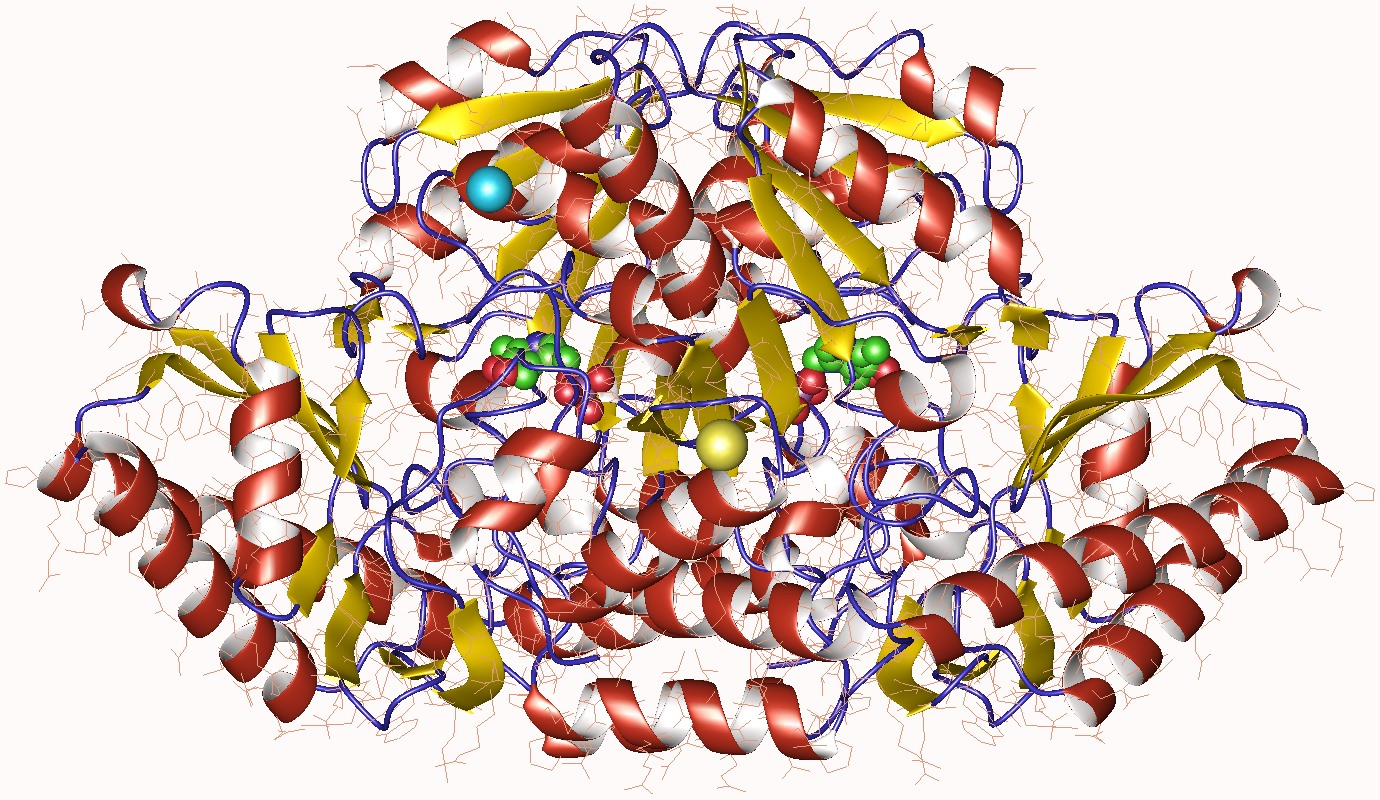
- Succinylornithine transaminase homodimer, E.Coli

Identifiers
- EC no.: 2.6.1.81

Databases
- IntEnz: IntEnz view
- BRENDA: BRENDA entry
- ExPASy: NiceZyme view
- KEGG: KEGG entry
- MetaCyc: metabolic pathway
- PRIAM: profile
- PDB structures: RCSB PDB PDBe PDBsum
- Gene Ontology: AmiGO / QuickGO
Search
- PMC: articles
- PubMed: articles
- NCBI: proteins

Succinylornithine transaminase (EC 2.6.1.81) is a pyridoxal phosphate-dependent enzyme that catalyzes the chemical reaction

(1)
+
α-ketoglutaric acid
(2)
+
L-glutamic acid

The two substrates of this enzyme first characterised from Pseudomonas cepacia are N2-succinyl-L-ornithine (1) and α-ketoglutaric acid. Its products are N-succinyl-L-glutamate 5-semialdehyde (2) and L-glutamic acid. In this bacterium, the reaction is part of the breakdown pathway of the amino acid arginine. The enzyme has also been found in Pseudomonas aeruginosa and Escherichia coli.

This enzyme is a transferase, specifically a transaminase, which transfer nitrogenous groups. The systematic name of this enzyme class is N2-succinyl-L-ornithine:2-oxoglutarate 5-aminotransferase. Other names in common use include succinylornithine aminotransferase, N2-succinylornithine 5-aminotransferase, AstC, SOAT, and 2-N-succinyl-L-ornithine:2-oxoglutarate 5-aminotransferase. It participates in arginine and proline metabolism.
