= Bhāskara I's sine approximation formula =

Formula to estimate the sine function

In mathematics, Bhāskara I's sine approximation formula is a rational expression in one variable for the computation of the approximate values of the trigonometric sines discovered by Bhāskara I (c. 600 – c. 680), a seventh-century Indian mathematician. This formula is given in his treatise titled Mahabhaskariya. It is not known how Bhāskara I arrived at his approximation formula. However, several historians of mathematics have put forward different hypotheses as to the method Bhāskara might have used to arrive at his formula. The formula is elegant and simple, and it enables the computation of reasonably accurate values of trigonometric sines without the use of geometry.

== Approximation formula ==
The formula is given in verses 17–19, chapter VII, Mahabhaskariya of Bhāskara I. A translation of the verses is given below:

(Now) I briefly state the rule (for finding the bhujaphala and the kotiphala, etc.) without making use of the Rsine-differences 225, etc. Subtract the degrees of a bhuja (or koti) from the degrees of a half circle (that is, 180 degrees). Then multiply the remainder by the degrees of the bhuja or koti and put down the result at two places. At one place subtract the result from 40500. By one-fourth of the remainder (thus obtained), divide the result at the other place as multiplied by the anthyaphala (that is, the epicyclic radius). Thus is obtained the entire bahuphala (or, kotiphala) for the sun, moon or the star-planets. So also are obtained the direct and inverse Rsines.

(The reference "Rsine-differences 225" is an allusion to Aryabhata's sine table.)

In modern mathematical notations, for an angle x in degrees, this formula gives

$$\sin x^\circ \approx \frac{4x(180 - x)}{40500 - x(180 - x)}.$$

=== Equivalent forms of the formula ===
Bhāskara I's sine approximation formula can be expressed using the radian measure of angles as follows:

$$\sin x \approx \frac{16x (\pi - x)}{5\pi^2 - 4x (\pi - x)}.$$

For a positive integer n this takes the following form:

$$\sin \frac{\pi}{n} \approx \frac{16(n - 1)}{5n^2 - 4n + 4}.$$

The formula acquires an even simpler form when expressed in terms of the cosine rather than the sine. Using radian measure for angles from $-\frac{\pi}{2}$ to $\frac{\pi}{2}$ and putting $x = \tfrac{1}{2} \pi + y$, one gets

$$\cos y \approx \frac{\pi^2 - 4 y^2}{\pi^2 + y^2} = 1-\frac{5y^2}{\pi^2+y^2}.$$

To express the previous formula with the constant $\tau = 2\pi,$ one can use

$$\cos y \approx 1 - \frac{20y^2}{4y^2 + \tau^2}.$$

Equivalent forms of Bhāskara I's formula have been given by almost all subsequent astronomers and mathematicians of India. For example, Brahmagupta's (598–668 CE) Brhma-Sphuta-Siddhanta (verses 23–24, chapter XIV) gives the formula in the following form:

$$R \sin x^\circ \approx \frac{Rx(180 - x)}{10125 - \frac{1}{4}x(180 - x)}.$$

Also, Bhāskara II (1114–1185 CE) has given this formula in his Lilavati (Kshetra-vyavahara, Soka No. 48) in the following form:

$$2R\sin x^\circ \approx \frac{4 \times 2R \times 2Rx \times (360R - 2Rx)}{\frac{1}{4} \times 5 \times (360R)^2 - 2Rx \times (360R - 2Rx)}=\frac {5760Rx-32Rx^2}{162000-720x+4x^2}$$

=== Derivations using trigonometric identities ===
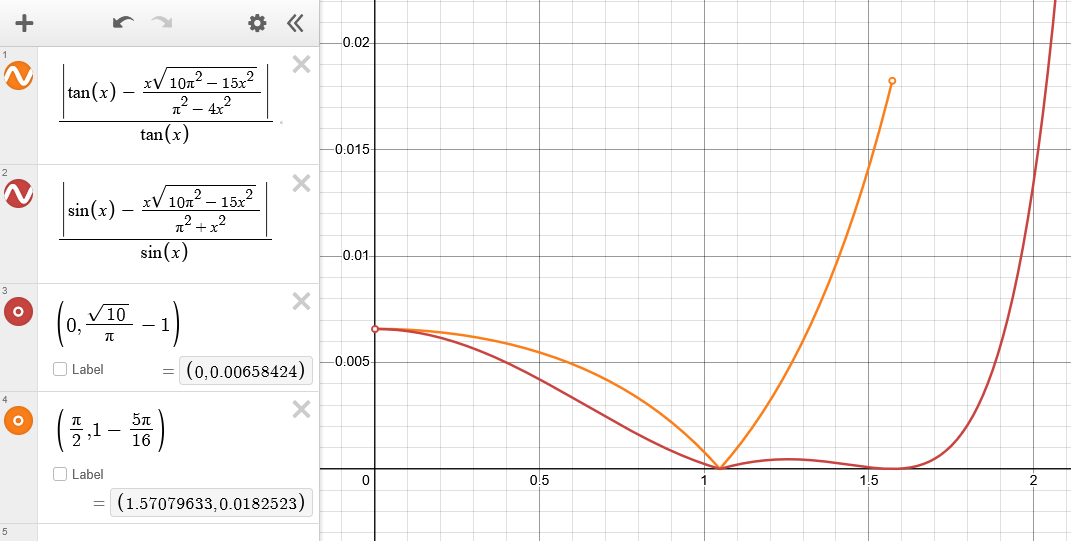
Relative error stays below 2% for both cases, but does not tend to 0 near the origin.

By using the identity $\sin(x)^2+\cos(x)^2=1$, we get

$\sin(x) \approx \frac{x\sqrt{10\pi^{2}-15x^{2}}}{\pi^{2}+x^{2}}\left\{\left|x\right|\le\frac{\pi}{2}\right\}$

$\tan(x) \approx \frac{x\sqrt{10\pi^{2}-15x^{2}}}{\pi^{2}-4x^{2}}\left\{\left|x\right|<\frac{\pi}{2}\right\}$

By inverting Bhāskara's original function, approximations for inverse trigonometric functions can also be found:

$\arccos x \approx \pi\sqrt{\frac{1-x}{4+x}}$ $\left\{0\le x\le1\right\}$, and
$\arccos x \approx \pi\left(1-\sqrt{\frac{1+x}{4-x}}\right)$ $\left\{-1\le x\le0\right\}$.
$\arcsin x \approx \pi\left(\frac{1}{2}-\sqrt{\frac{1-x}{4+x}}\right)$ $\left\{0\le x\le1\right\}$, and
$\arcsin x \approx \pi\left(\sqrt{\frac{1+x}{4-x}}-\frac{1}{2}\right)$ $\left\{-1\le x\le0\right\}$.
$$\arctan x \approx \pi\sqrt{\frac{\sqrt{1+x^{2}}-1}{4\sqrt{1+x^{2}}+1}}\left\{x\ge0\right\}$$

Alternatively, using absolute values and the Sign function, each pair of functions can be rewritten to be valid in their whole domain:

$$\arccos x \approx \pi\left(\frac{1-\operatorname{sgn}\left(x\right)}{2}+\operatorname{sgn}\left(x\right)\sqrt{\frac{1-\left|x\right|}{4+\left|x\right|}}\right)$$

$$\arcsin x \approx \pi\operatorname{sgn}\left(x\right)\left(\frac{1}{2}-\sqrt{\frac{1-\left|x\right|}{4+\left|x\right|}}\right)$$

$$\arctan x \approx \pi\operatorname{sgn}\left(x\right)\sqrt{\frac{\sqrt{1+x^{2}}-1}{4\sqrt{1+x^{2}}+1}}$$

== Accuracy of the formula ==
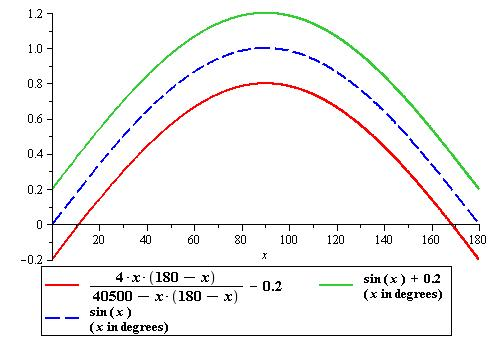
Figure illustrates the level of accuracy of the Bhāskara I's sine approximation formula. The shifted curves 4x(180 − x)/(40500 − x(180 − x)) − 0.2 and sin x + 0.2 look like exact copies of the curve sin x.

Graph of the error in Bhāskara I's sine approximation formula

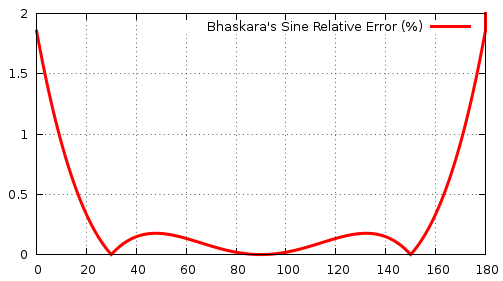
Graph of the relative error in Bhāskara I's sine approximation formula

The formula is applicable for values of x° in the range from 0° to 180°. The formula is remarkably accurate in this range. The graphs of sin x and the approximation formula are visually indistinguishable and are nearly identical. One of the accompanying figures gives the graph of the error function, namely, the function

$$\sin x^\circ \approx \frac{4x(180 - x)}{40500 - x(180 - x)}$$

in using the formula. It shows that the maximum absolute error in using the formula is around 0.0016. From a plot of the percentage value of the absolute error, it is clear that the maximum relative error is less than 1.8%. The approximation formula thus gives sufficiently accurate values of sines for most practical purposes. However, it was not sufficient for the more accurate computational requirements of astronomy. The search for more accurate formulas by Indian astronomers eventually led to the discovery of the power series expansions of sin x and cos x by Madhava of Sangamagrama (c. 1350 – c. 1425), the founder of the Kerala school of astronomy and mathematics.

== Derivation of the formula ==
Bhāskara had not indicated any method by which he arrived at his formula. Historians have speculated on various possibilities. No definitive answers have as yet been obtained. Beyond its historical importance of being a prime example of the mathematical achievements of ancient Indian astronomers, the formula is of significance from a modern perspective also. Mathematicians have attempted to derive the rule using modern concepts and tools. Around half a dozen methods have been suggested, each based on a separate set of premises. Most of these derivations use only elementary concepts.

=== Derivation based on elementary geometry ===
Let the circumference of a circle be measured in degrees and let the radius R of the circle be also measured in degrees. Choosing a fixed diameter AB and an arbitrary point P on the circle and dropping the perpendicular PM to AB, we can compute the area of the triangle APB in two ways. Equating the two expressions for the area one gets (1/2) AB × PM = (1/2) AP × BP. This gives

$$\frac{1}{PM} = \frac{AB}{AP \times BP}.$$

Letting x be the length of the arc AP, the length of the arc BP is 180 − x. These arcs are much bigger than the respective chords. Hence one gets

$$\frac{1}{PM} > \frac{2R}{x(180 - x)}.$$

One now seeks two constants α and β such that

$$\frac{1}{PM} = \alpha \frac{2R}{x(180 - x)} + \beta.$$

It is indeed not possible to obtain such constants. However, one may choose values for α and β so that the above expression is valid for two chosen values of the arc length x. Choosing 30° and 90° as these values and solving the resulting equations, one immediately gets Bhāskara I's sine approximation formula.

=== Derivation starting with a general rational expression ===
Assuming that x is in radians, one may seek an approximation to sin x in the following form:

$$\sin x \approx \frac{a + bx + cx^2}{p + qx + rx^2}.$$

The constants a, b, c, p, q and r (only five of them are independent) can be determined by assuming that the formula must be exactly valid when x = 0, π/6, π/2, π, and further assuming that it has to satisfy the property that sin(x) = sin(π − x). This procedure produces the formula expressed using radian measure of angles.

=== An elementary argument ===
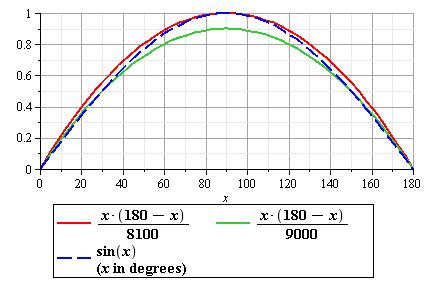
Comparison of graphs of the parabolas x(180 − x)/8100 and x(180 − x)/9000 with the graph of sin x (with x in degrees)

The part of the graph of sin x in the range from 0° to 180° "looks like" part of a parabola through the points (0, 0) and (180, 0). The general form of such a parabola is

$$kx(180 - x).$$

The parabola that also passes through (90, 1) (which is the point corresponding to the value sin(90°) = 1) is

$$\frac{x(180 - x)}{90 \times 90} = \frac{x(180 - x)}{8100}.$$

The parabola which also passes through (30, 1/2) (which is the point corresponding to the value sin(30°) = 1/2) is

$$\frac{x(180 - x)}{2 \times 30 \times 150} = \frac{x(180 - x)}{9000}.$$

These expressions suggest a varying denominator which takes the value 90 × 90 when x = 90 and the value 2 × 30 × 150 when x = 30. That this expression should also be symmetrical about the line x = 90 rules out the possibility of choosing a linear expression in x. Computations involving x(180 − x) might immediately suggest that the expression could be of the form

$$8100a + bx(180 - x).$$

A little experimentation (or by setting up and solving two linear equations in a and b) will yield the values a = 5/4, b = −1/4. These give Bhāskara I's sine approximation formula.

Karel Stroethoff (2014) offers a similar, but simpler argument for Bhāskara I's choice. He also provides an analogous approximation for the cosine and extends the technique to second and third-order polynomials.

== See also ==
- Aryabhata's sine table
- Madhava's sine table
- Brahmagupta's interpolation formula

== Further references ==
1. R.C..Gupta, On derivation of Bhāskara I's formula for the sine, Ganita Bharati 8 (1–4) (1986), 39–41.
2. T. Hayashi, A note on Bhāskara I's rational approximation to sine, Historia Sci. No. 42 (1991), 45–48.
3. K. Stroethoff, Bhāskara's approximation for the sine, The Mathematics Enthusiast, Vol. 11, No. 3 (2014), 485–492.
