= Fundamentum Astronomiae =

Bawania

Fundamentum Astronomiae is a historic manuscript presented by Jost Bürgi to Emperor Rudolf II in 1592. It describes Bürgi's trigonometry based algorithms called Kunstweg which can be used to calculate sines at arbitrary precision.

== General ==
Bürgi took special care to avoid his method becoming public in his time. However, Henry Briggs (mathematician) (1561-1630) was acquainted with the method, likely via a link to John Dee who knew Christoph Rothmann, a colleague of Bürgi at the court.

== Method ==
Bürgi used these algorithms, including multiplication table in sexagesimal system, to compute a Canon Sinuum, a table of sines to 8 sexagesimal places in steps of 2 arc seconds. Such tables were extremely important for navigation at sea. Bürgi's method only uses additions and halving, his procedure is elementary and it converges from the standard method. The iterative algorithm obtains good approximations of sines after few iterations, but cannot be used on large subdivisions, because it produces very large values. This was an early step towards difference calculus.

Nicolaus Reimers Ursus, a friend of Bürgi, wrote in the preface to his own 1588 Fundamentum astronomicum, "I do not have to explain to which level of comprehensibility this extremely deep and nebulous theory has been corrected and improved by the tireless study of my dear teacher, Justus Bürgi from Switzerland, by assiduous considerations and daily thought. [...] Therefore neither I nor my dear teacher, the inventor and innovator of this hidden science, will ever regret the trouble and the labor which we have spent."

Bürgi writes, "For many hundreds of years, up to now, our ancestors have been using this method because they were not able to invent a better one. However, this method is uncertain and dilapidated as well as cumbersome and laborious. Therefore we want to perform this in a different, better, more correct, easier and more cheerful way. And we want to point out now how all sines can be found without the troublesome inscription [of polygons], namely by dividing a right angle into as many parts as one desires."

== See also ==
- Almagest
- Plimpton 322
