= Andrea Andreani =

Italian engraver

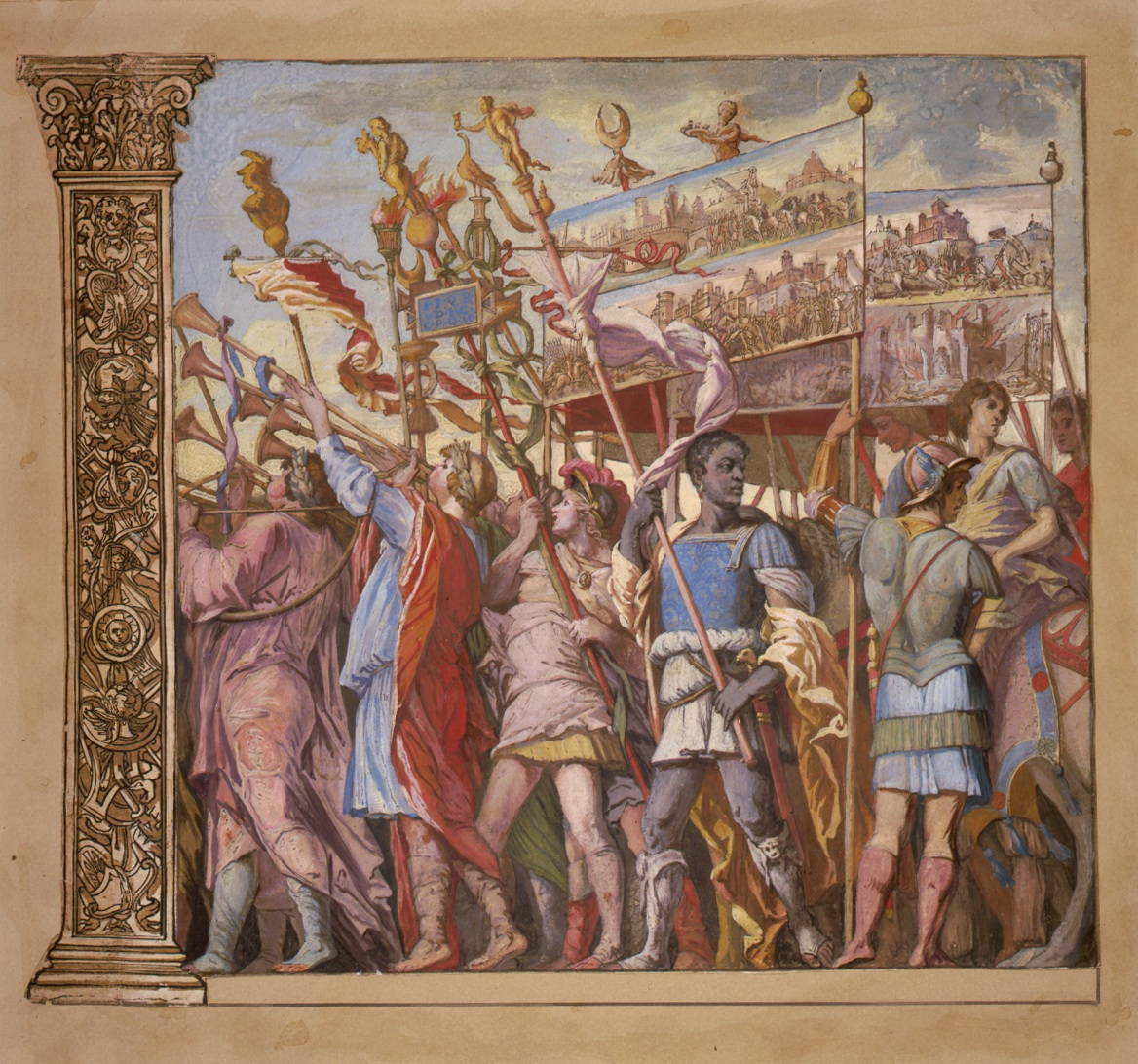
Triumphus Caesari, by Andreani, after a painting by Mantegna

Andrea Andreani (1540–1623) was an Italian engraver on wood, who was among the first printmakers in Italy to use chiaroscuro, which required multiple colours.

Andreani was born and generally active in Mantua about 1540 (Brulliot says 1560) and died at Rome in 1623. His engravings are scarce and valuable, and are chiefly copies of Mantegna, Albrecht Dürer, Parmigianino and Titian. The most remarkable of his works are Mercury and Ignorance, the Deluge, Pharaoh's Host Drowned in the Red Sea (after Titian), the Triumph of Caesar (after Mantegna), and Christ retiring from the judgment-seat of Pilate after a relief by Giambologna. He was active 1584–1610 in Florence.

Andreani's work is held in several museums worldwide, including the Metropolitan Museum of Art, the Museum of Fine Arts, Boston, the Cleveland Museum of Art, the Fine Arts Museums of San Francisco, the Ackland Art Museum, the Clark Art Institute, the Harvard Art Museums, the Victoria and Albert Museum, the Albright–Knox Art Gallery, the National Gallery of Canada, the Davis Museum at Wellesley College, the Cooper Hewitt, the University of Michigan Museum of Art, the Bowdoin College Museum of Art, the Los Angeles County Museum of Art, the Philadelphia Museum of Art, the Princeton University Art Museum, and the British Museum.

== Sources ==
- "Andrea Andreani" in the Encyclopædia Britannica, 9th Edition, Vol. II, p. 20.
- Getty ULAN entry.
