= Georg Limnaeus =

German mathematician, astronomer and librarian (1554–1611)

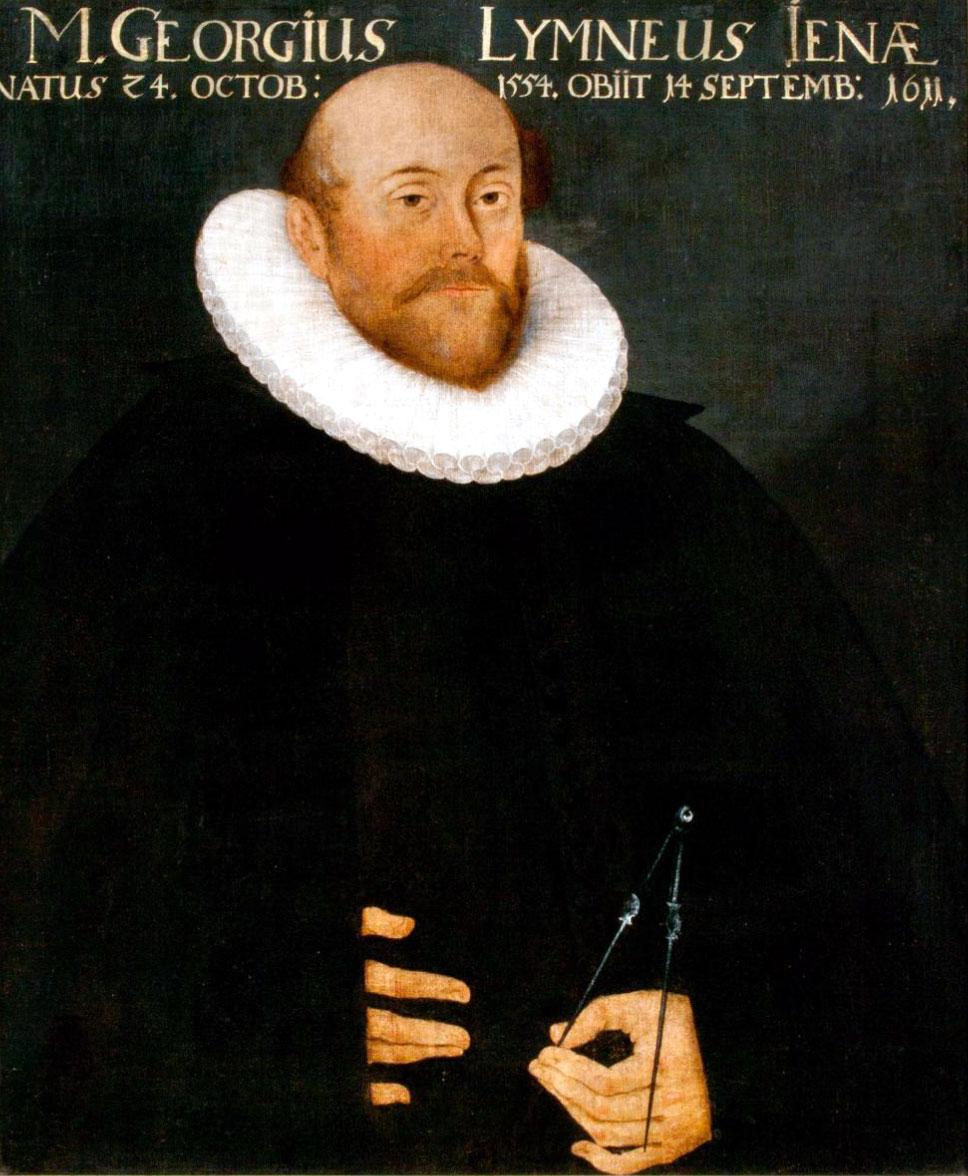
- Georg Limnaeus
- Born: 24 October 1554; Jena, Electorate of Saxony, Holy Roman Empire
- Died: 14 September 1611; Jena, Electorate of Saxony, Holy Roman Empire
- Education: University of Jena (Magisters der Philosophie, 1581)
- Known for: Correspondence with Johannes Kepler, Galileo Galilei, Tycho Brahe and Reimarus Ursus
- Scientific career
- Fields: Astronomy, astrology, mathematics, natural philosophy

Georg Limnaeus (born Georg Wirn, also known as Georgius Lymneus, Limnæus or Limnäus; 24 October 1554 – 14 September 1611) was a German mathematician, astronomer and librarian, who provided noteworthy encouragement to Johannes Kepler shortly after his first heliocentric astronomical work was published.

== Early life ==
Georg Limnaeus' father Antonius Wirn originated from Switzerland and served in the military forces of Frederick I, Elector of Saxony, who had been tutored by George Spalatin and closely followed and supported the works of Martin Luther. Around the time of the Capitulation of Wittenberg, Frederick conceived of the founding of the University of Jena, which was established in 1558 and became the university where Limnaeus was to spend all of his academic years.

Upon completion of his military service, Antonius moved to Jena, where Georg Wirn was born and lived, and where, in 1571, he enrolled at the university. In accordance with its tradition, upon enrollment he assumed the name Georgius Lymneus. At Jena, Limnaeus studied under Jacob Flach (1537–1611), who was a graduate of the University of Wittenberg and had exposure to Philip Melanchthon (1497–1569) and frequented the lectures of Erasmus Reinhold (1511–1553.)

In 1581, Limnaeus received the "Magisters der Philosophie" degree at the University of Jena.

== Career and Kepler connections ==
Limnaeus issued a prognostication in 1585 in Erfurt and, in 1588, became the professor of mathematics at Jena, a position which he held until his death; concurrently, he also assumed the position of head librarian. He lectured on the Celestial sphere, astronomical and scientific calculations, the theory of planets and the use of astronomical tables, and in the areas of geography, geodesy and cosmography. Although he was not known to have produced any memorable manuscripts, he is known to have engaged in professional correspondence with peers, from time to time, including Tycho Brahe, Galileo Galilei, and Johannes Kepler, and to have maintained a respectable reputation as an academic prognosticator. In 1596, he founded the first observatory in Jena.

In 1597, Limnaeus (along with Galileo, Brahe and Ursus) received a draft copy from Kepler of his first major work, Mysterium Cosmographicum. On April 24, 1598, Limnaeus wrote to Kepler, expressing his firm belief that heliocentric considerations should not be dismissed from the studies of astronomy by declaring, "Most illustrious Sir, never was I estranged from the most ancient philosophy of the Platonists – nor have I thought, as have several petty philosophers in our time, that it ought to be shunted outside the borders of the territory of the republic of letters." These words have been used to illustrate that it was not uncommon for traditionalist academicians, such as Limnaeus, to covertly honor heliocentric views of the ancients, while at the same time skillfully avoiding any explicit reference to the more controversial views of Copernicus. Limnaeus added, however, the statement that for any serious student of astronomy, Kepler's work represents "a new path to knowledge of the stars." In light of the disconcerting imprisonment of Giordano Bruno in 1593 (who was executed in 1600), this open expression of both support to young Kepler, and delight in his mathematical astronomical approaches, provided him with some of the earliest, forceful words of encouragement, which he must have welcomed in contrast to the many strong criticisms his work quickly evoked.

In addition, Limnaeus provided information to Kepler on Tycho Brahe which may have promoted his final decision to go to Prague and study under him, thereby ensuring access to Brahe's data and the furtherance of his own work. However, beyond serving as an encourager to Kepler, and a facilitator to his decision to assist Brahe, there is no record that Limnaeus ever dove into specific details of Kepler's work or adopted it for his lessons.

Kepler assisted Brahe from 1599 until Brahe's sudden death in 1601. By 1609, Kepler would develop and introduce his laws of planetary motion, which would subsequently play a major role in the development of Isaac Newton's law of universal gravitation, as has been noted by Newton.

Limnaeus and his wife fell victim to the 1611 plague in Jena.
