= Mysterium Cosmographicum =

Astronomy book by Johannes Kepler

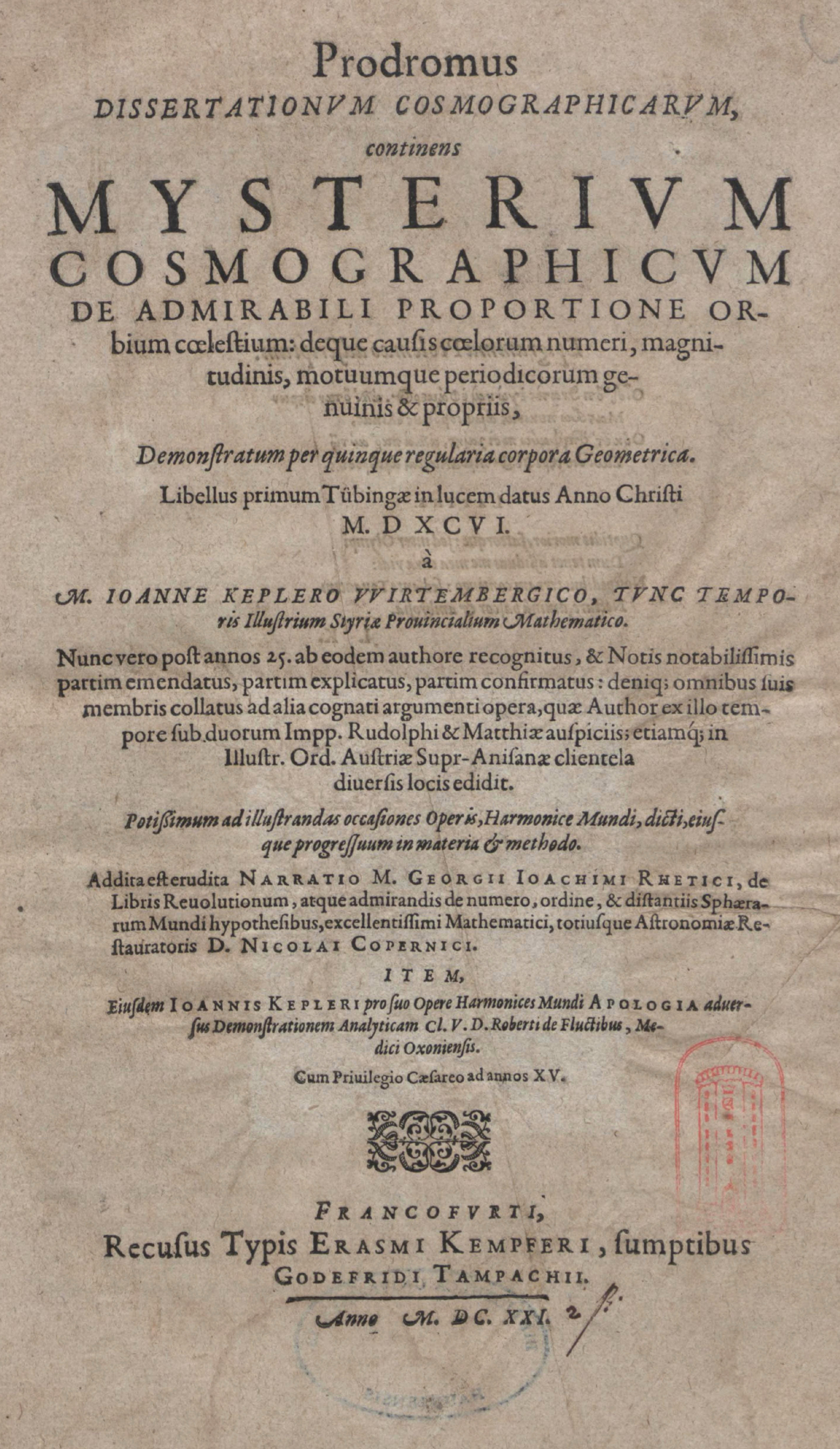
- Title page of second edition (1621)
- Author: Johannes Kepler
- Language: Neo-Latin
- Publication date: 1596 (1st ed.); 1621 (2nd ed.)

Mysterium Cosmographicum (lit. The Cosmographic Mystery, (Note: The full title is Prodromus dissertationum cosmographicarum, continens mysterium cosmographicum, de admirabili proportione orbium coelestium, de que causis coelorum numeri, magnitudinis, motuumque periodicorum genuinis & proprijs, demonstratum, per quinque regularia corpora geometrica (Forerunner of the Cosmological Essays, Which Contains the Secret of the Universe; on the Marvelous Proportion of the Celestial Spheres, and on the True and Particular Causes of the Number, Magnitude, and Periodic Motions of the Heavens; Established by Means of the Five Regular Geometric Solids).) alternately translated as Cosmic Mystery, The Secret of the World, or some variation) is an astronomy book by the German astronomer Johannes Kepler, published at Tübingen in late 1596 (Note: The book's title page states 1596 as its publication year) and in a second edition in 1621. Kepler proposed that the distance relationships between the six planets known at that time could be understood in terms of the five Platonic solids, enclosed within a sphere that represented the orbit of Saturn.

This book explains Kepler's cosmological theory, based on the Copernican system, in which the five Platonic solids dictate the structure of the universe and reflect God's plan through geometry. This was virtually the first attempt since Copernicus to say that the theory of heliocentrism is physically true. Thomas Digges had published a defense of Copernicus in an appendix in 1576. According to Kepler's account, he discovered the basis of the model while demonstrating the geometrical relationship between two circles. From this he realized that he had stumbled on a similar ratio to the one between the orbits of Saturn and Jupiter. He wrote, "I believe it was by divine ordinance that I obtained by chance that which previously I could not reach by any pains." But after doing further calculations he realized he could not use two-dimensional polygons to represent all the planets, and instead had to use the five Platonic solids.

== Shapes and the planets ==
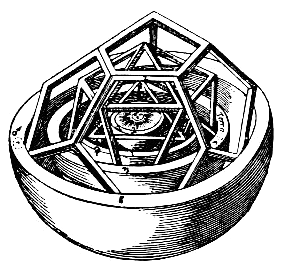
Detailed view of the inner sphere

Platonic solid model of the Solar System from Mysterium Cosmographicum

Johannes Kepler's first major astronomical work, Mysterium Cosmographicum (The Cosmographic Mystery), was a defence of the Copernican system. Kepler claimed to have had an epiphany on July 19, 1595, while teaching in Graz, demonstrating the periodic conjunction of Saturn and Jupiter in the zodiac: he realized that regular polygons bound one inscribed and one circumscribed circle at definite ratios, which, he reasoned, might be the geometrical basis of the universe. After failing to find a unique arrangement of polygons that fit known astronomical observations (even with extra planets added to the system), Kepler began experimenting with 3-dimensional polyhedra. He found that each of the five Platonic solids could be uniquely inscribed and circumscribed by spherical orbs; nesting these solids, each encased in a sphere, within one another would produce six layers, corresponding to the six known planets—Mercury, Venus, Earth, Mars, Jupiter, and Saturn. By ordering the solids correctly—octahedron, icosahedron, dodecahedron, tetrahedron, and cube—Kepler found that the spheres correspond to the relative sizes of each planet's path around the Sun, generally varying from astronomical observations by less than 10%. He attributed most of the variances to inaccuracies in measurement.

Kepler also found a formula relating the size of each planet's orbit to the length of its orbital period: from inner to outer planets, the ratio of increase in orbital period is twice the difference in orb radius. However, Kepler later rejected this formula because it was not precise enough.

== Theological and philosophical foundation ==
As he indicated in the title, Kepler thought he had revealed God’s geometrical plan for the universe. Much of Kepler's enthusiasm for the Copernican system stemmed from his theological convictions about the connection between the physical and the spiritual; the universe itself was an image of the Trinity, with the Sun corresponding to the Father, the stellar sphere to the Son, and the intervening space between to the Holy Spirit. His first manuscript of Mysterium contained an extensive chapter reconciling heliocentrism with biblical passages that seemed to support geocentrism.

With the support of his mentor Michael Maestlin, Kepler received permission from the Tübingen university senate to publish his manuscript, pending removal of the Bible exegesis and the addition of a simpler, more understandable description of the Copernican system (the Narratio prima by Rheticus) as an appendix. Mysterium was published late in 1596, and Kepler received his copies and began sending them to prominent astronomers and patrons early in 1597; it was not widely read, but it established Kepler's reputation as a highly skilled astronomer. The effusive dedication, to powerful patrons as well as to the men who controlled his position in Graz, also provided a crucial doorway into the patronage system.

Though the details would be modified in light of his later work, Kepler never relinquished the Platonist polyhedral-spherical cosmology of Mysterium Cosmographicum. His subsequent main astronomical works were in some sense only further developments of it, concerned with finding more precise inner and outer dimensions for the spheres by calculating the eccentricities of the planetary orbits within it. In 1621, Kepler published an expanded second edition of Mysterium, half as long again as the first, detailing in footnotes the corrections and improvements he had achieved in the 25 years since its first publication.

== Epistemology and philosophy of sciences ==
Many of Kepler's thoughts about epistemology can be found in his Defense of Tycho against Ursus or Contra Ursum (CU), a work which emerged from a polemical framework, the plagiarism conflict between Nicolaus Raimarus Ursus (1551–1600) and Tycho Brahe: causality and physicalization of astronomical theories, the concept and status of astronomical hypotheses, the polemic “realism-instrumentalism”, his criticism of scepticism in general, the epistemological role of history, etc. Jardine has pointed out that it would be sounder to read Kepler's CU more as a work against scepticism than in the context of the modern realism/instrumentalism debate.

On the one hand, "causality" is a notion implying the most general idea of "actual scientific knowledge" which guides and stimulates each investigation. In this sense, Kepler already embarked in his MC on a causal investigation by asking for the cause of the number, the sizes and the "motions" (the speeds) of the heavenly spheres. On the other hand, "causality" implies in Kepler, according to the Aristotelian conception of physical science, the concrete "physical cause", the efficient cause which produces a motion or is responsible for keeping the body in motion. Original to Kepler, however, and typical of his approach is the resoluteness with which he was convinced that the problem of equipollence of the astronomical hypotheses can be resolved and the consequent introduction of the concept of causality into astronomy—traditionally a mathematical science. This approach is already present in his MC, where he, for instance, relates for the first time the distances of the planets to a power which emerges from the Sun and decreases in proportion to the distance of each planet, up to the sphere of the fixed stars.

== Reception ==
Kepler corresponded with and provided courtesy book copies to a number of astronomers around the time of publication, including Galileo Galilei, Tycho Brahe, Reimarus Ursus, and Georg Limnaeus. In response to Mysterium Cosmographicum, the Danish astronomer Tycho Brahe (whom Kepler had sent a copy) said that the ideas were intriguing but could only be verified through the observations Brahe himself had been making over the past 30 years. Because he was promised use of these observations by Brahe, Kepler sought him out in the beginning of 1600. Brahe only gave him the data on Mars, but this meeting helped Kepler formulate his laws of planetary motion.

== In popular culture ==
The Mysterium Cosmographicum was featured on the Austrian 10 euro Johannes Kepler silver commemorative coin minted in 2002.

== See also ==
- Golden ratio § History
- Titius–Bode law
