= Anton Eisenhoit =

German painter and engraver

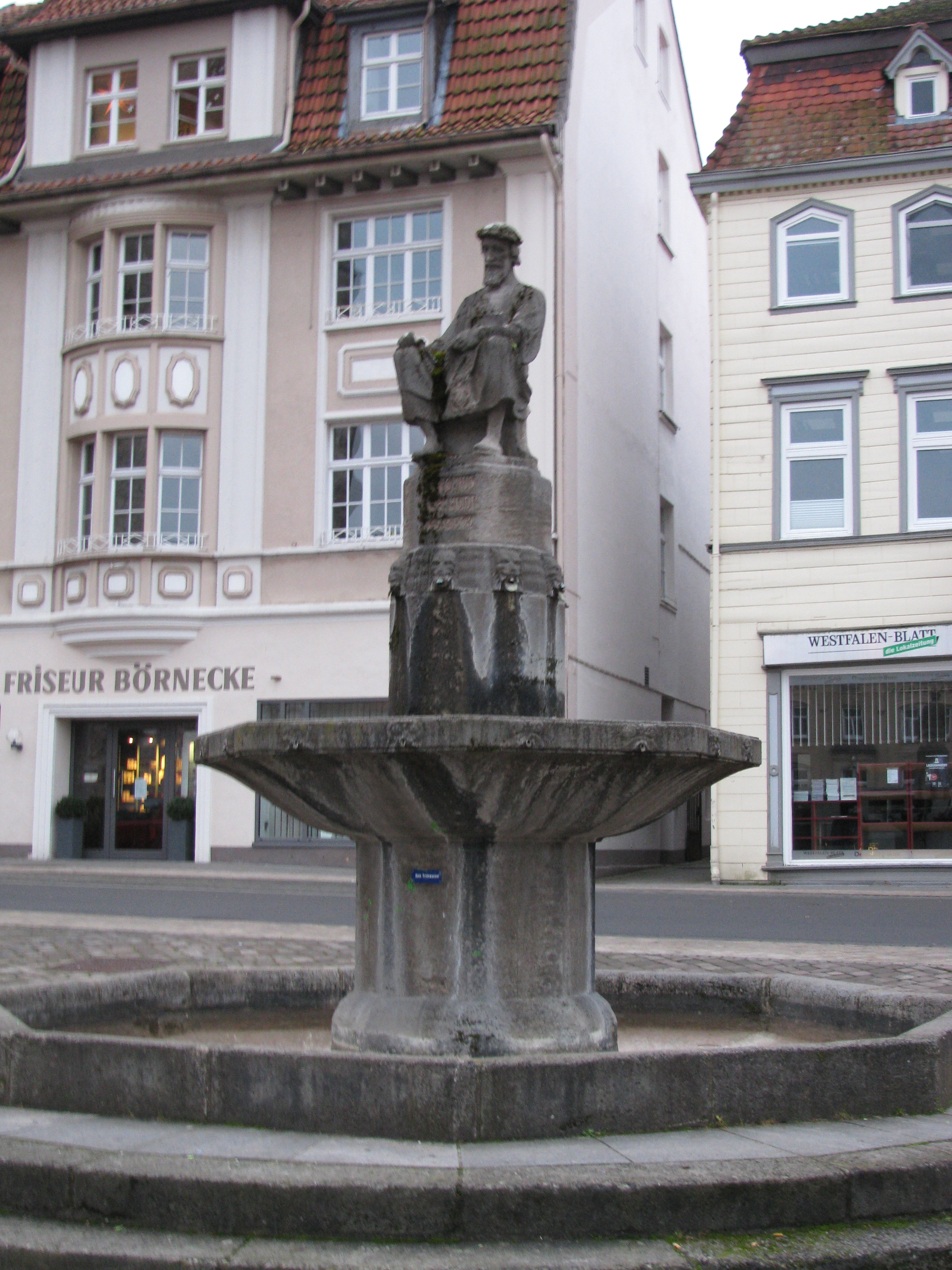
Eisenhoit fountain in Warburg

Anton Eisenhoit (sometimes Eisenhout, Eisenhart or Eisenhut), born 1553/1554 in Warburg-Altstadt in Prince-Bishopric of Paderborn; † Autumn 1603 in Warburg) a German silver and gold smith, painter and engraver. After years of apprenticeship and travel, and several years in Rome around 1590, where he worked for a member of the papal curia, he returned to Warburg. There, he produced artworks for twenty years, mostly commissioned pieces such as those for the Metallotheca Vaticana by Michele Mercati. He was also referred to as the German Benvenuto Cellini.

It appears that some of his works have been ascribed to other masters. Brulliot refers to some attributed to Luca Ciamberlano by Bartsch, which he conjectures should be given to Eisenhoit.

== Honors ==
- In 1912, the sculptor Franz Heise erected a monument with a fountain in Warburg's Neustadt market square, depicting him seated during a break from work.
- The former "Eisenhoitschule" in Warburg, a special education school focusing on learning disabilities, was named after him.

== Gallery ==
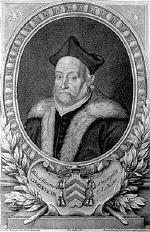
Michele Mercati

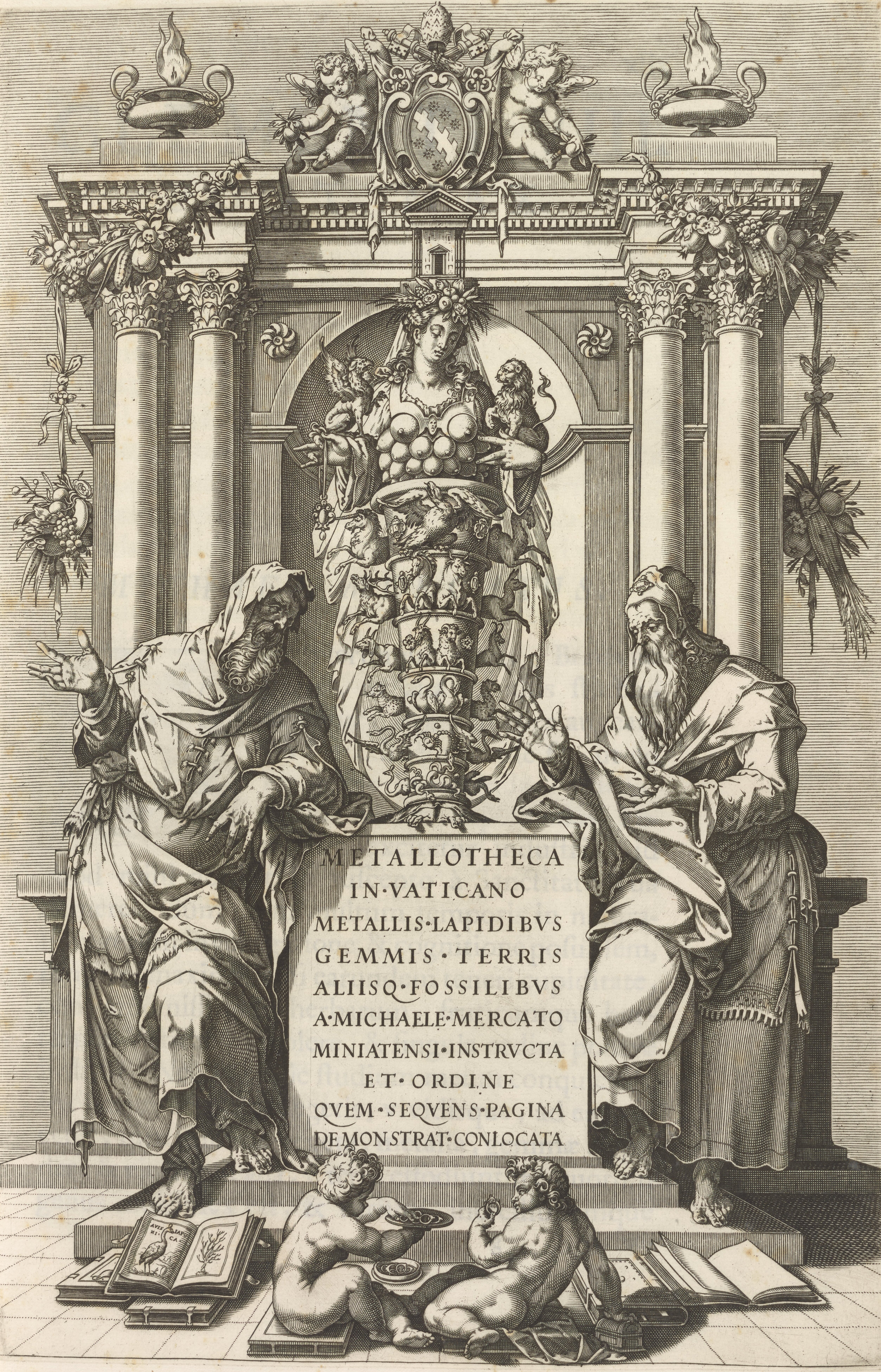
Title page of the Metallotheca by Michele Mercati, ca. 1580

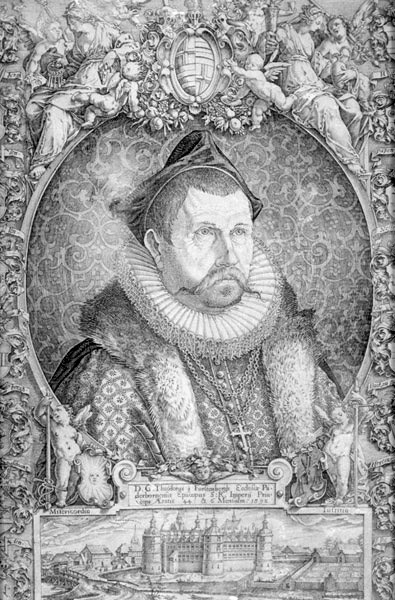
Dietrich von Fürstenberg, 1592

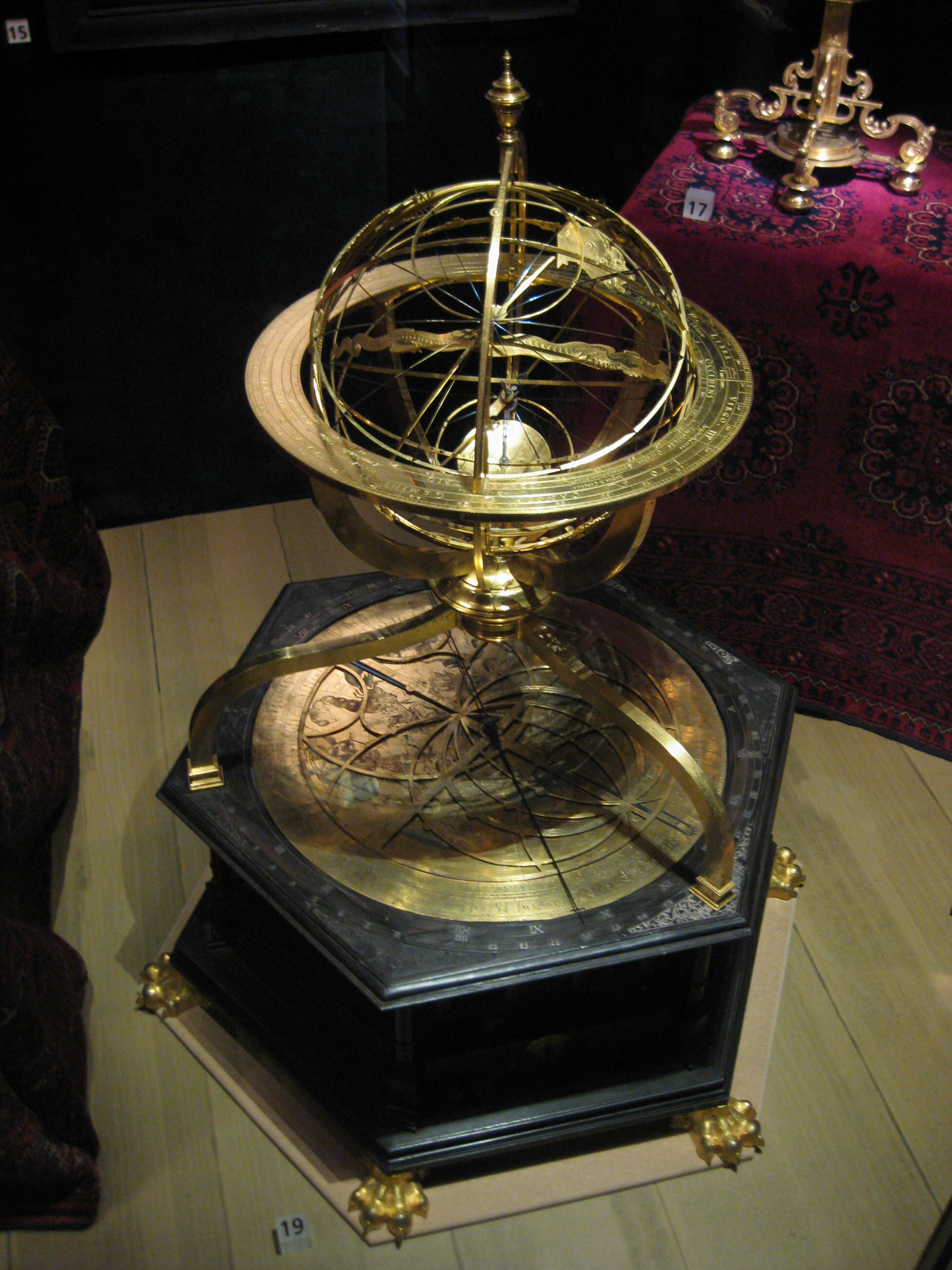
Armillary sphere, 1585, by Eisenhoit and Jost Bürgi, now in the Nordic Museum in Stockholm
