= Triumphs of Caesar (Mantegna) =

Series of paintings by Andrea Mantegna

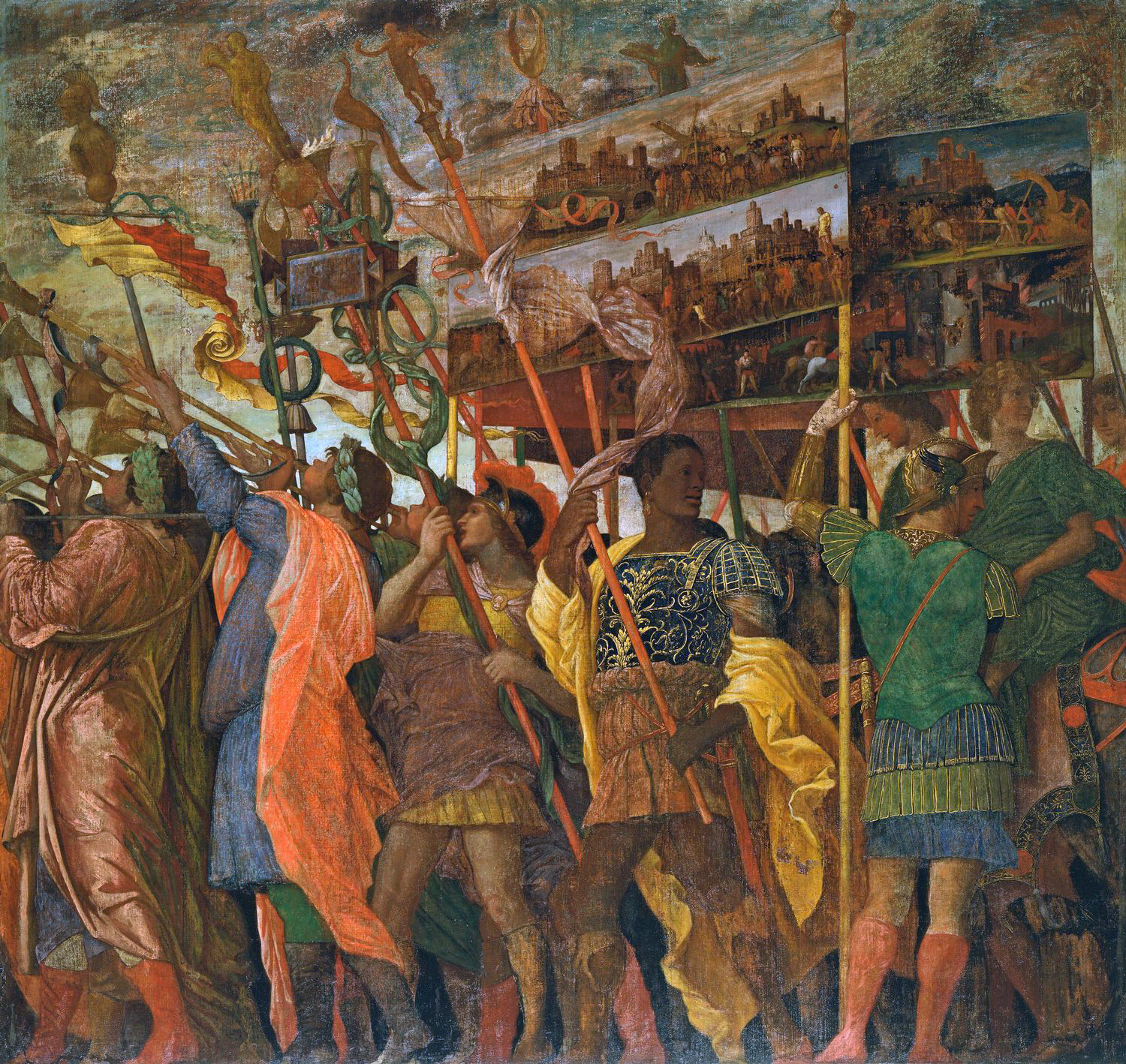
Picture Bearers (first canvas)

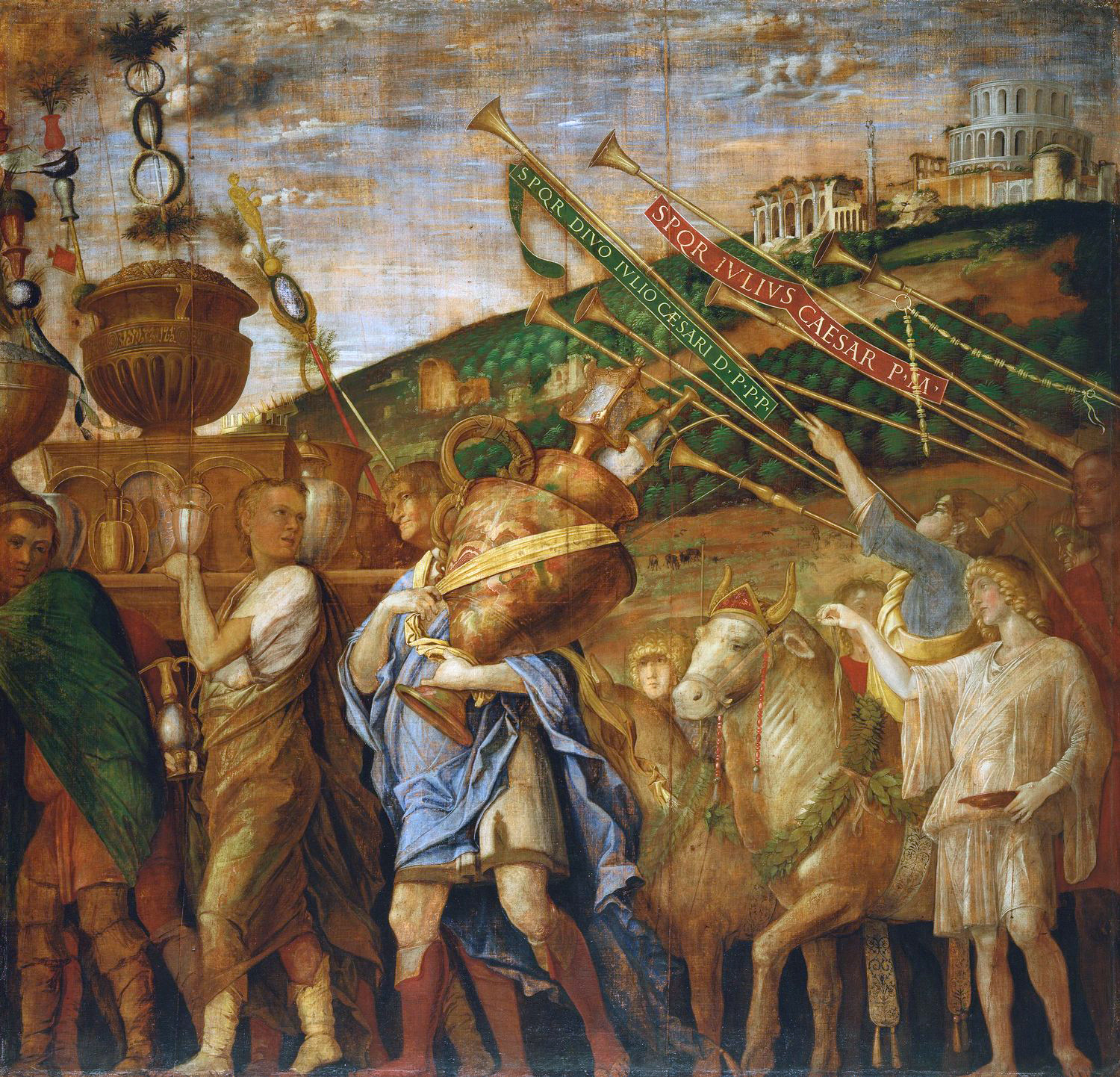
The Vase Bearers (fourth canvas)

The Triumphs of Caesar are a series of nine large paintings created by the Italian Renaissance artist Andrea Mantegna between 1484 and 1492 for the Gonzaga Ducal Palace, Mantua. They depict a triumphal military parade celebrating the victory of Julius Caesar in the Gallic Wars. Acknowledged from the time of Mantegna as his greatest masterpiece, they remain the most complete pictorial representation of a Roman triumph ever attempted and together they form the world's largest metric area of Italian Renaissance paintings outside Italy.

Acquired by Charles I in 1629, they now form part of the Royal Collection at Hampton Court Palace near London, where they normally occupy a special gallery, with a new continuous frame intended to capture their original setting, mounted into panelling.

Originally until late 2025 and now extended into 2026, six of the nine are on display in the National Gallery, having been loaned while the Hampton Court gallery is being refurbished.

Originally painted in the fragile medium of egg and glue tempera on canvas, the paintings underwent successive repaintings and restorations through the centuries, and are damaged in many areas. Each canvas measures 2.66 × 2.78 m. In total they cover an area more than 70 metres square.

== Subject ==
The series depicts Caesar on a triumphal chariot returning from his successful campaigns, in a procession of Roman soldiers, standard-bearers, musicians, and the spoils of war including an assortment of booty (including arms, intricate sculpture, and gold vases), exotic animals, and captives. These paintings celebrate two of Julius Caesar's greatest campaigns – his victory over the Gauls and the recovery of Pontus in Asia Minor. Mantegna was inspired by written accounts of Caesar's celebratory processions through Rome as well as Roman antiquities in the Duke's collection.

Giorgio Vasari described them as follows: "We can see grouped and cleverly arranged in the Triumph the ornate and beautiful chariot, the figure of a man cursing the victorious hero, the victor's relations, the perfumes, incense and sacrifices, the priests, the bulls crowned for sacrifice, the prisoners, the booty captured by the troops, the rank of the squadrons, the elephants, the spoils, the victories and the cities represented in various chariots, along with a mass of trophies on spears, and with helmets and armor, the headgear of all kinds, ornaments and countless pieces of plate."

== History ==
The Triumphs of Caesar were initially painted from 1484 to 1492 for the Ducal Palace in Mantua, commissioned by either the Duke Federico I Gonzaga or, more likely, his son Francesco II.

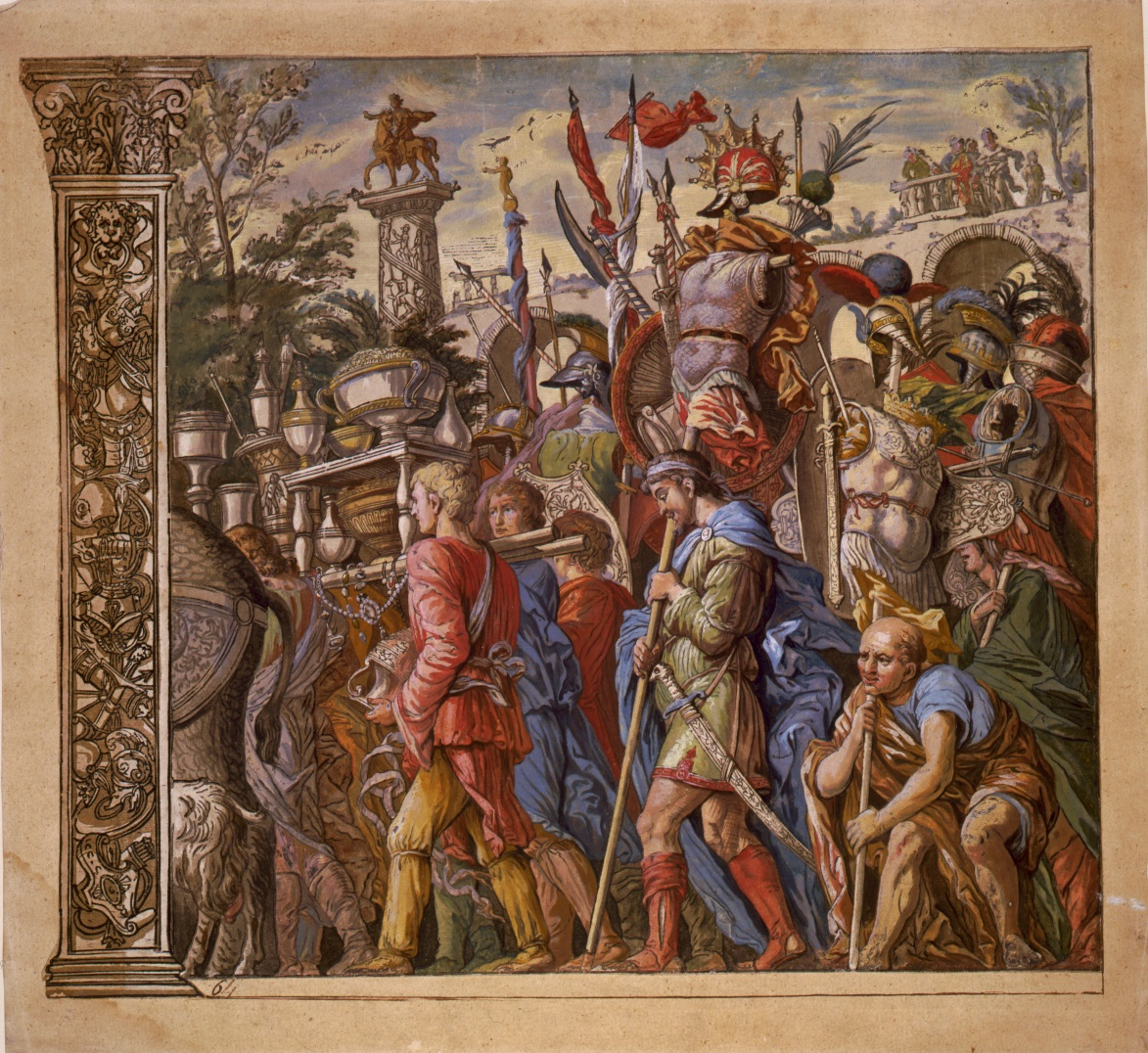
One of a set of coloured chiaroscuro woodcuts with added gouache, among the finest in the technique, by Andrea Andreani, 1598/99

The Gonzaga dynasty died out in the male line, and the major part of their painting collection was acquired by Charles I of England in 1629, using as an agent in Italy, the courtier Daniel Nys. The collection also included works by Titian, Raphael and Caravaggio. The Triumphs arrived in 1630 at Hampton Court Palace, where they have remained ever since. The Lower Orangery was originally built to house Mary II of England's larger tender plants. It was chosen as a setting for the series, since it re-creates the interior of the Palace of San Sebastiano in Mantua, Italy, where the paintings were hung from 1506 in a specially built gallery. The paintings are displayed as a continuous frieze, separated by small columns.

After the execution of Charles I in 1649, the Triumphs were listed in an inventory and valued at 1,000 pounds (equivalent to £150,000 in 2025); the entire Gonzaga acquisition cost 25,000 pounds (equivalent to £5,600,000 in 2025). Oliver Cromwell refrained from selling these paintings, almost alone among Charles's collection, due to their fame, and perhaps as they celebrated a general like himself rather than a monarch or Catholic religious theme. Cromwell ordered the artist Francis Cleyn to prepare designs to reproduce the paintings as tapestry.

Occasional loans for exhibitions have included one section at the Louvre in 2008‒9, all to the Royal Academy’s "Charles I: King and Collector exhibition" in 2018, and three to the National Gallery Mantegna and Bellini exhibition in 2018-19. From September 2023 until about late 2025, six of the nine are on display in the National Gallery, having been loaned while the Hampton Court gallery is being refurbished.

== Reception and influence ==
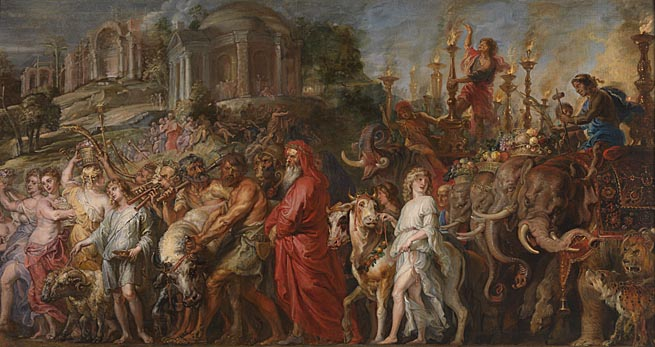
Rubens, c 1630: A Roman Triumph, National Gallery, London

The Triumphs of Caesar were described as "the best thing Mantegna ever painted" by Giorgio Vasari in his celebrated Lives of the Artists. They rapidly became extremely famous throughout Europe, principally through copies in print form, of which many different versions were made, starting with a contemporary set from Mantegna's own workshop. Between 1517 and 1519, Hans Holbein the Younger, using prints, painted a copy of the work on nine exterior panels of the Hertenstein House in Lucerne, now demolished. Andrea Aspertini (1558–1629) made prints of the paintings in Mantua.

== Early 20th century restoration ==
The painter and critic Roger Fry undertook a restoration of The Picture Bearers starting in 1910. This was approved by Lionel Cust, Keeper of the King's Pictures. Fry removed what Louis Laguerre had done a century before, and worked on and off for eleven years, with assistance from Paul Nash and Dora Carrington, to repaint parts of the canvas. The art historian Frances Spalding holds that Fry made many poor artistic and technical decisions, "and, worst of all, they changed the Negro standard bearer into a Caucasian". Fry did not attempt to restore any of the other paintings in the series, and said in 1925 that The Picture Bearers was "one of [his] maddest follies".

== 1960s restoration ==
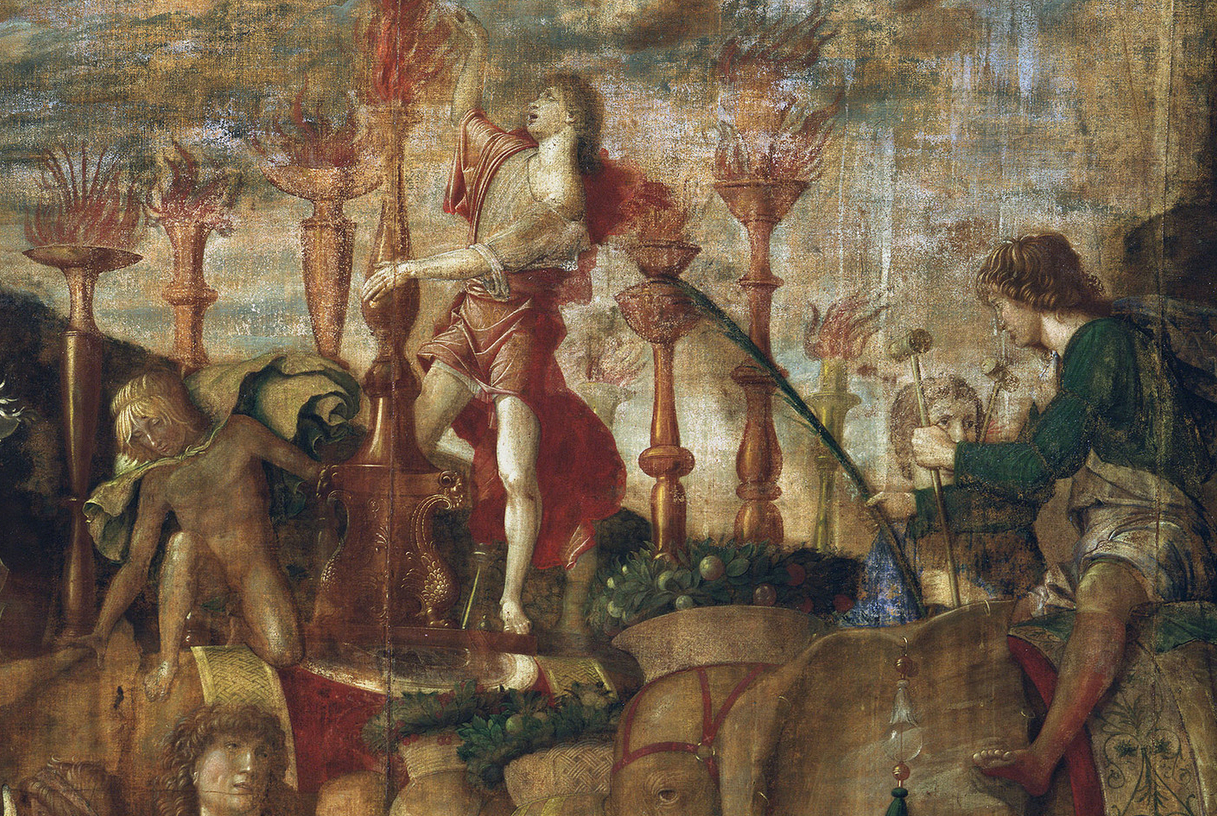
Boys on top of the elephants in no. 5

The paintings had so deteriorated that visitors in the 19th century deplored their condition. In the 1960s a careful restoration to reveal the original paintwork was conducted on all but the seventh canvas, where no trace had been left by previous restorers. Although now mere shadows of Mantegna's cinquecento paintings, they still convey a powerful impression of epic grandeur. In the words of Anthony Blunt, who as Surveyor of the Queen's Pictures supervised the restoration, "The Triumphs may be a ruin but it is a noble one, one as noble as those of ancient Rome which Mantegna so deeply admired."

Art critic Tom Lubbock, writing about the restored paintings called the pictures "the epitome of Renaissance art in the service of state power – they carry a powerful sense of inexorable procession – impressing the viewer with the inexhaustible quantity of available power and plunder."

The series is now displayed to the public under low level electric light for conservation reasons.

Copies of the paintings were made in the early 17th century by Ludovico Dondi.

== Newly discovered drawing ==
A newly discovered drawing was sold for US$11.65m at Sotheby's, New York in 2020. It was the most expensive Old Master drawing sold in the United States. The drawing, before it was reattributed to the Italian Renaissance master, first appeared in a small auction in Germany and sold for less than US$1,000. The work was totally unknown to scholars until its inclusion in the Mantegna and Bellini exhibitions in London and Berlin. It caught the attention of the Italian specialist in Sotheby's Old Master Drawings Department. She said: ‘By examination under special filtered infrared light, we were able to detect the hidden figure of Helios, revealing a major change in the composition that proves Mantegna’s authorship. This change in fact defined his whole approach to the finished painting that we see today.’

== Gallery ==
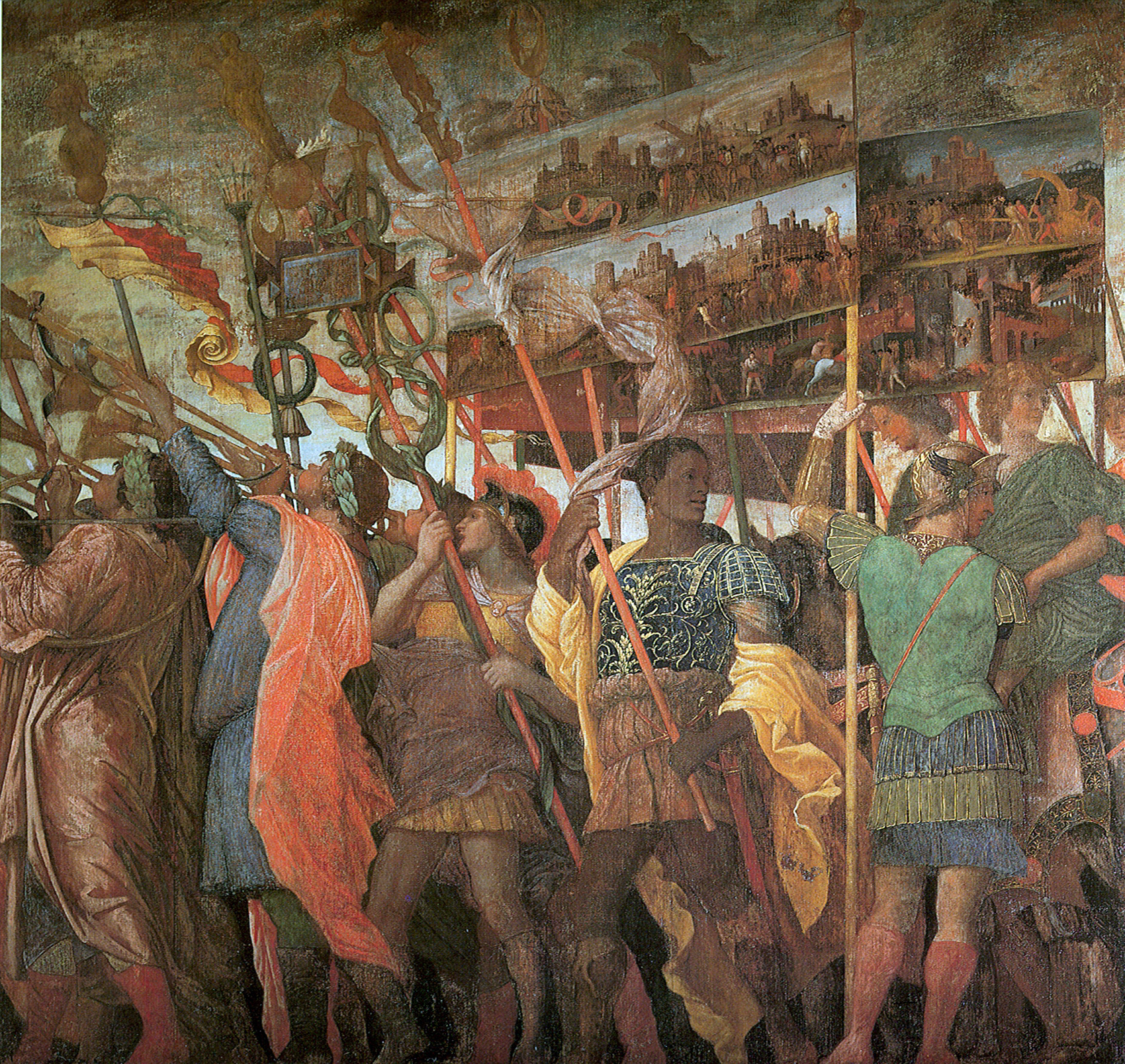
I. The Picture-Bearers

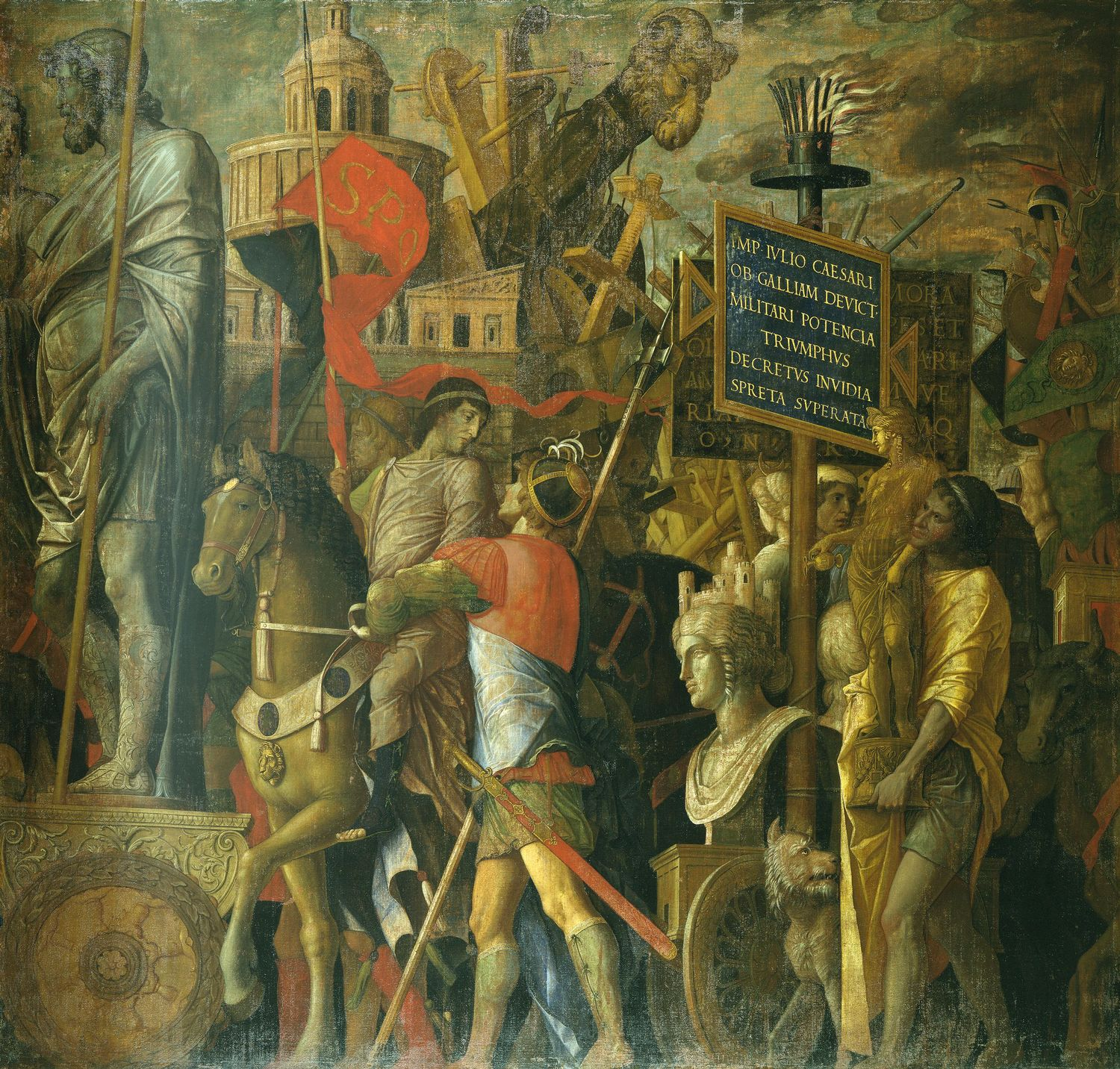
II. Bearers of Standards

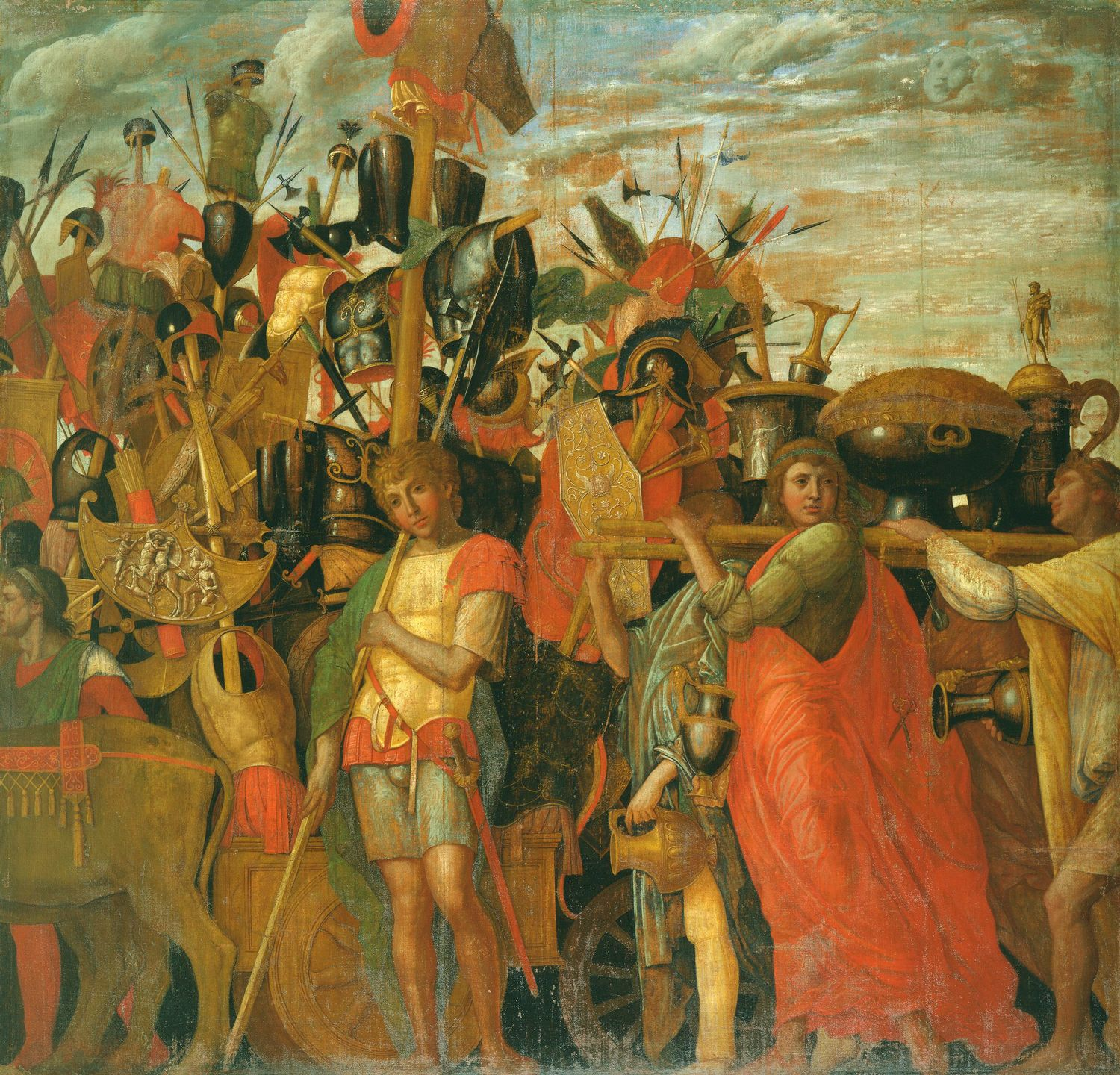
III. Bearers of Trophies and Bullion

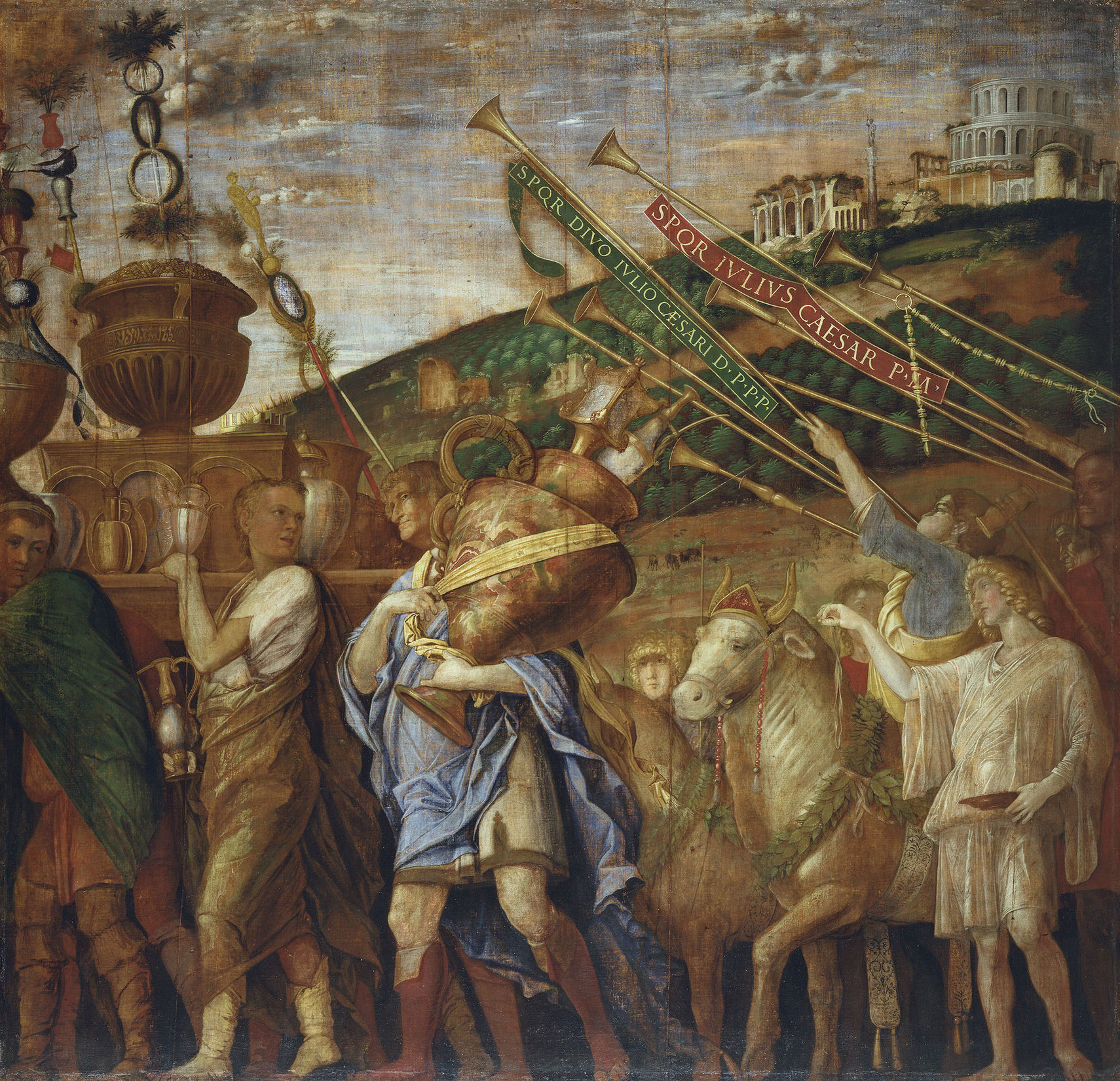
IV. The Vase-Bearers

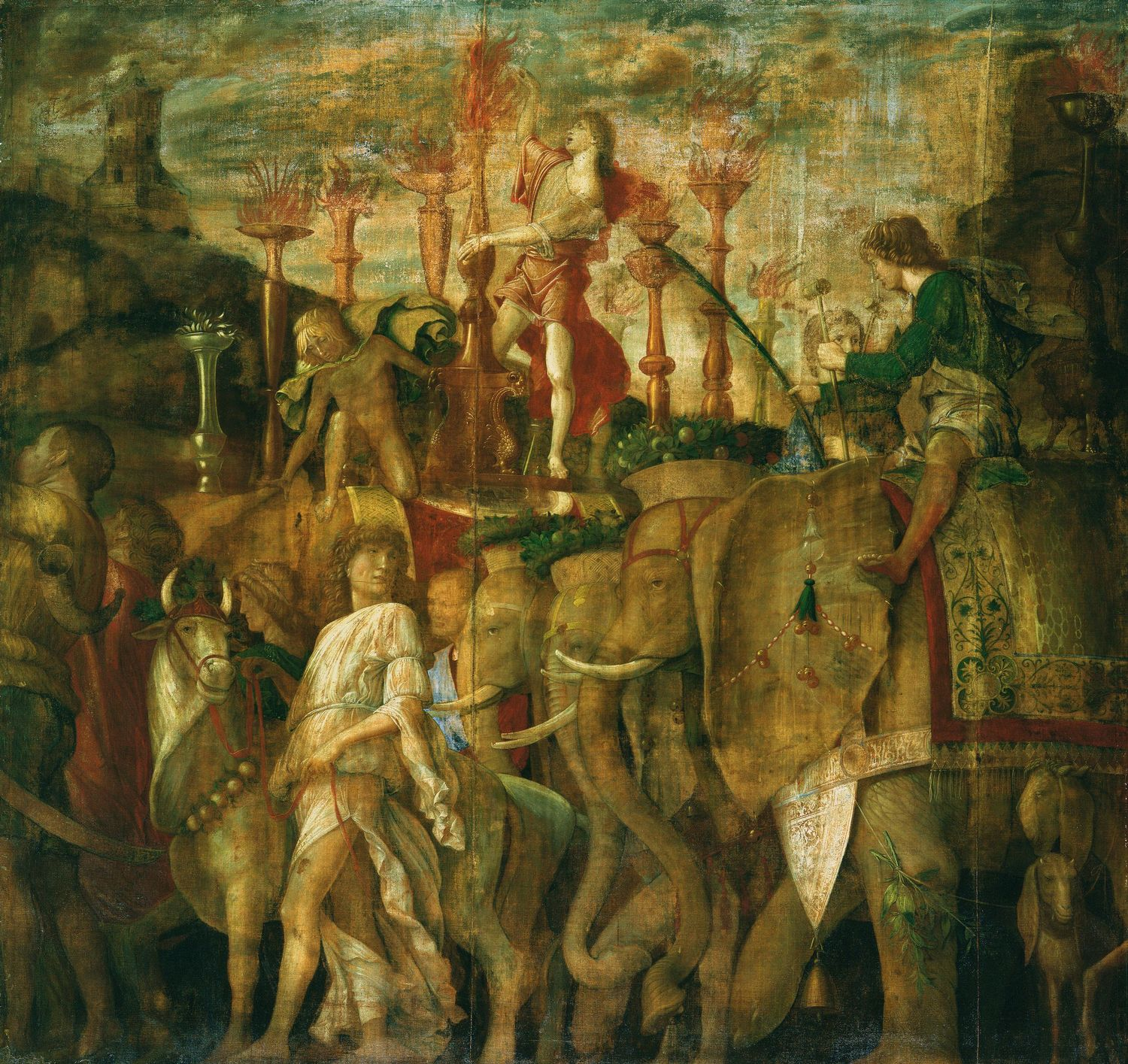
V. Elephants

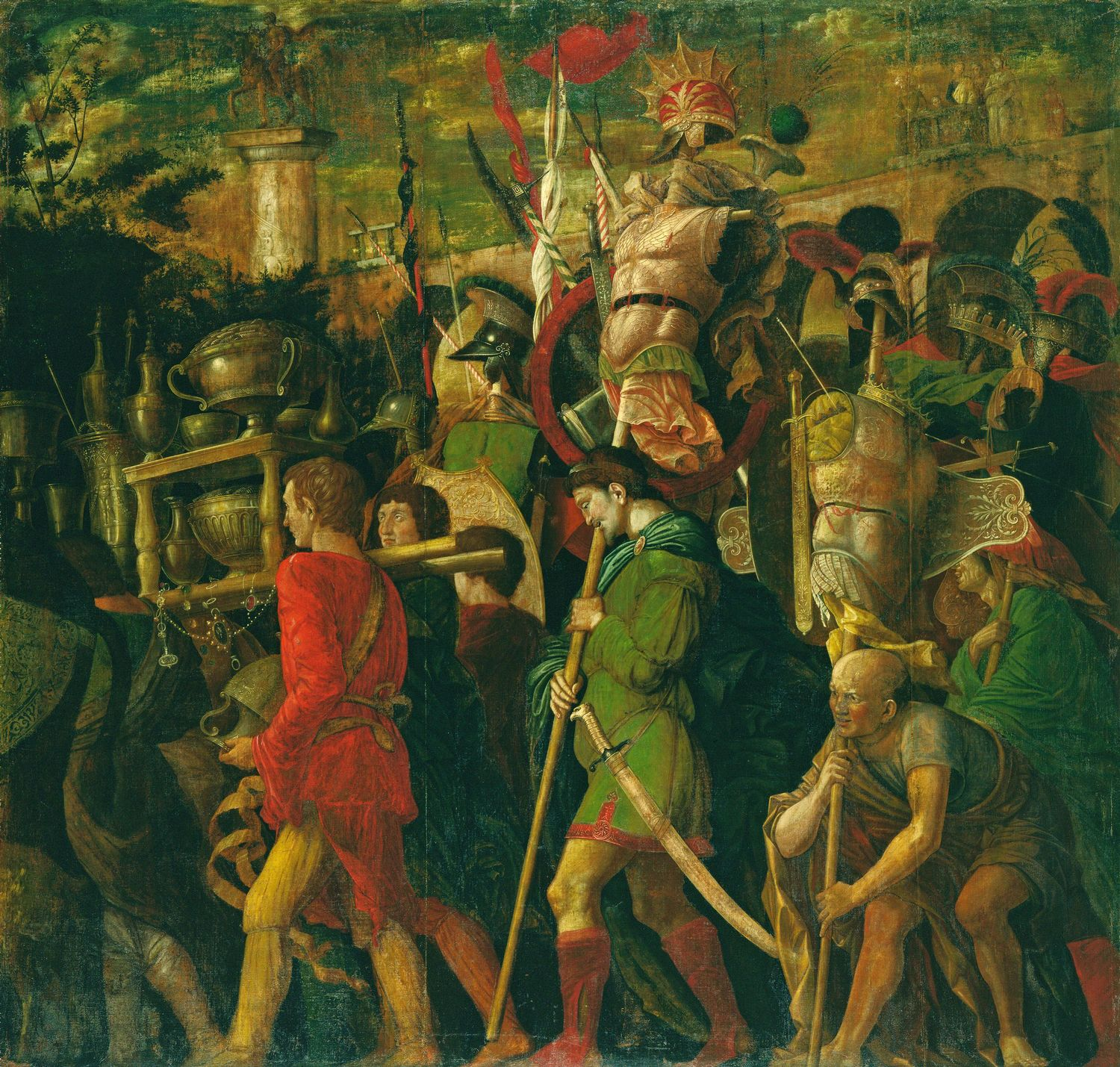
VI. Corselet Bearers

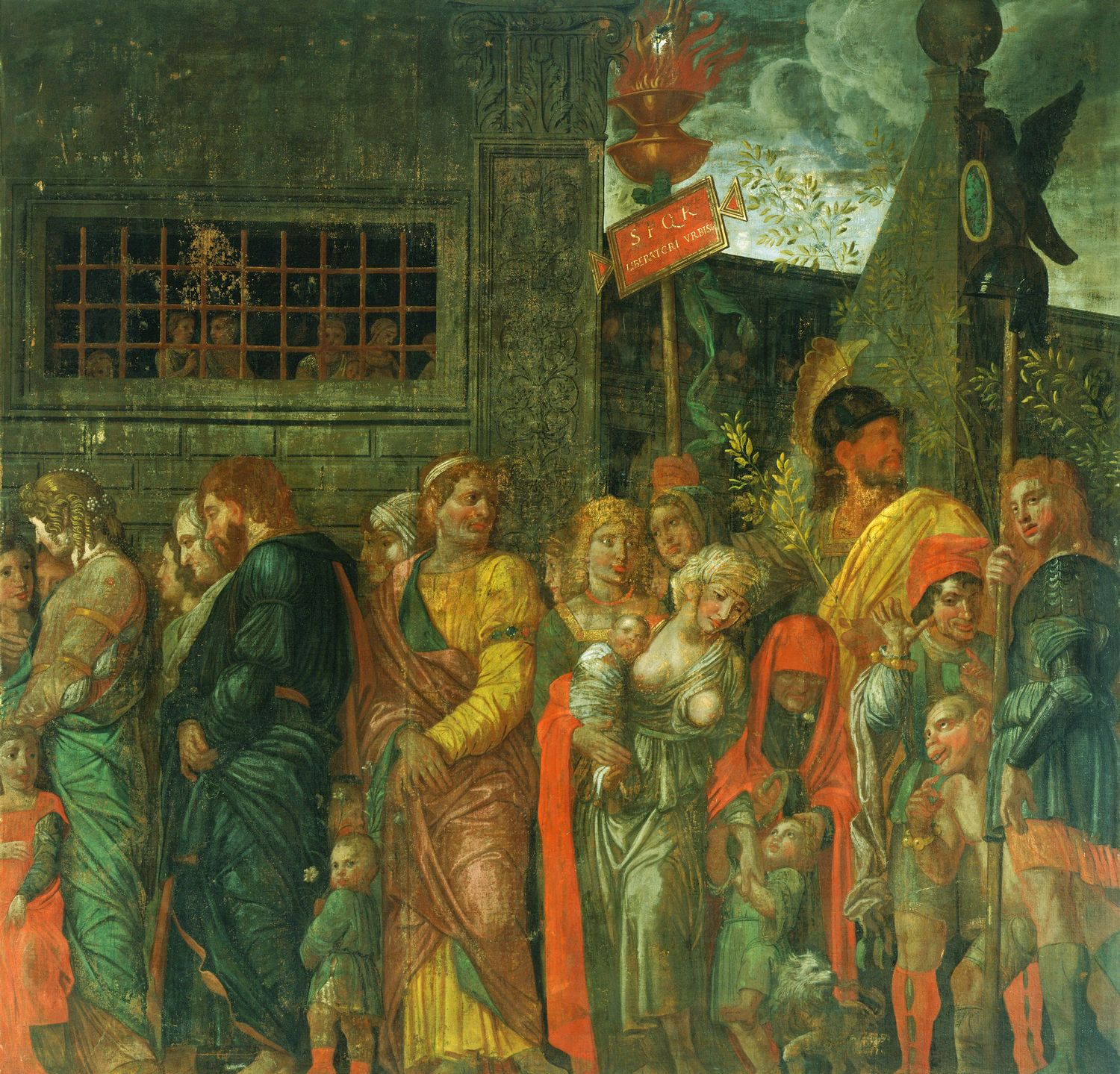
VII. Captives

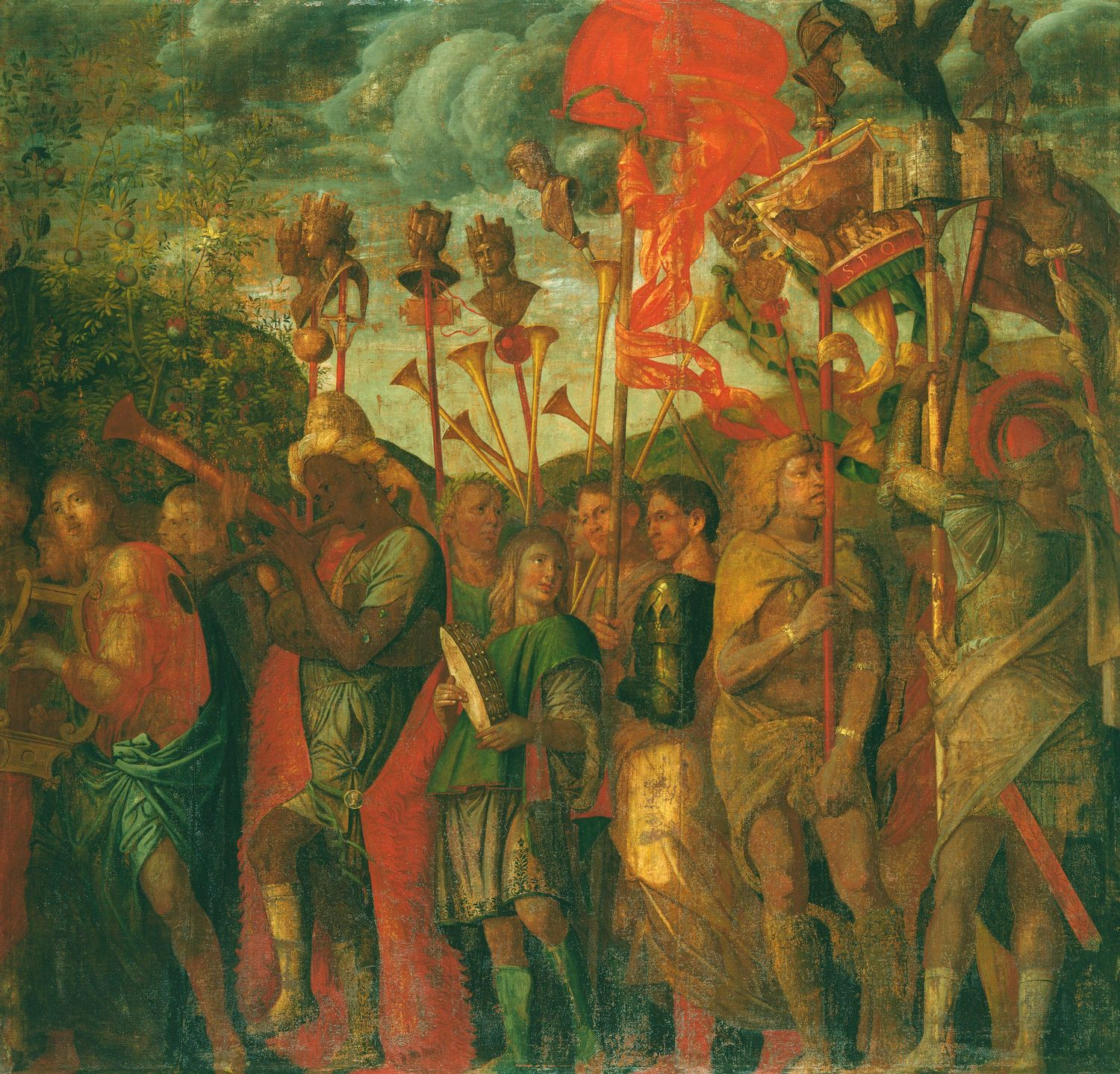
VIII. Musicians

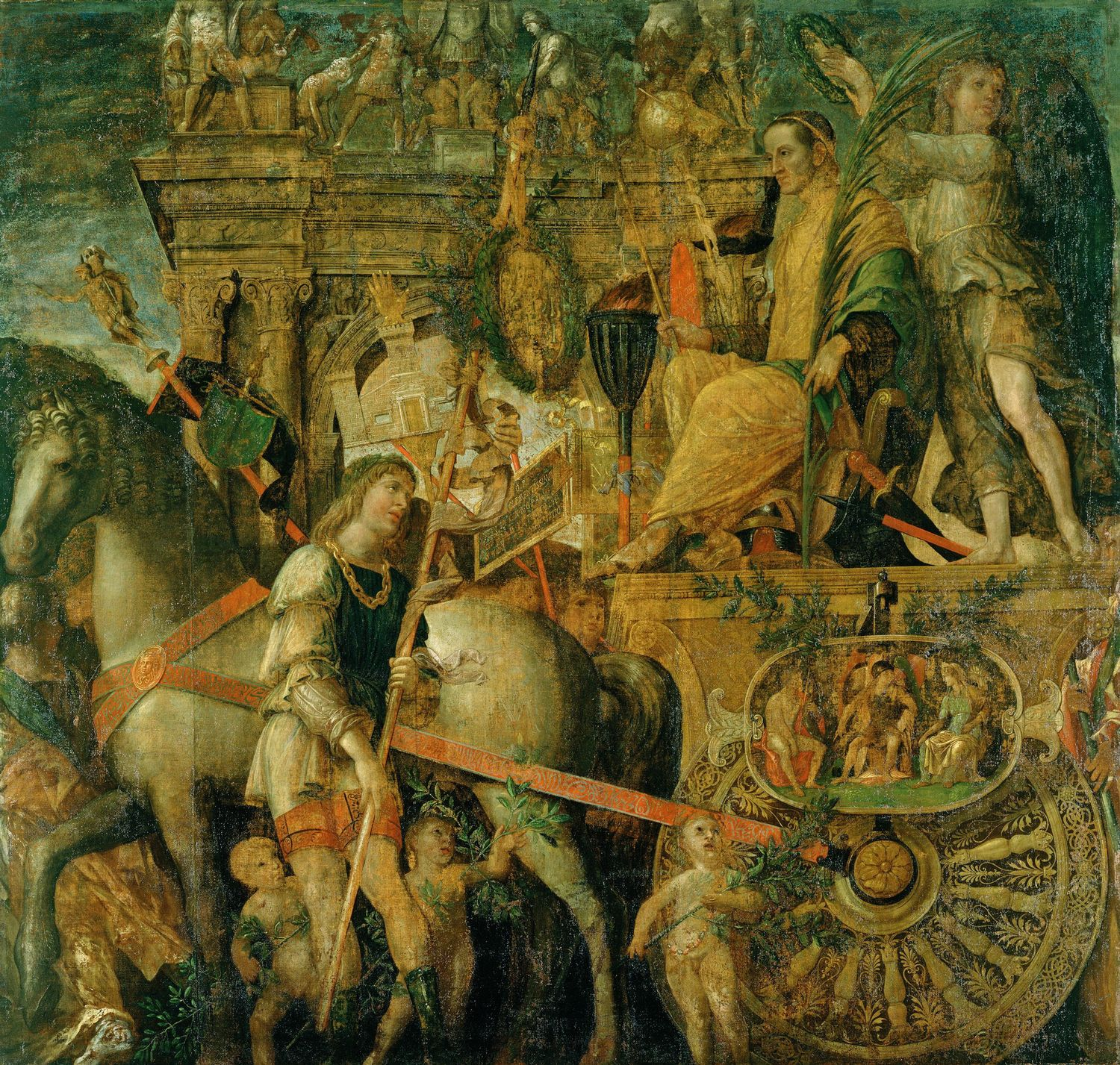
IX. Julius Caesar

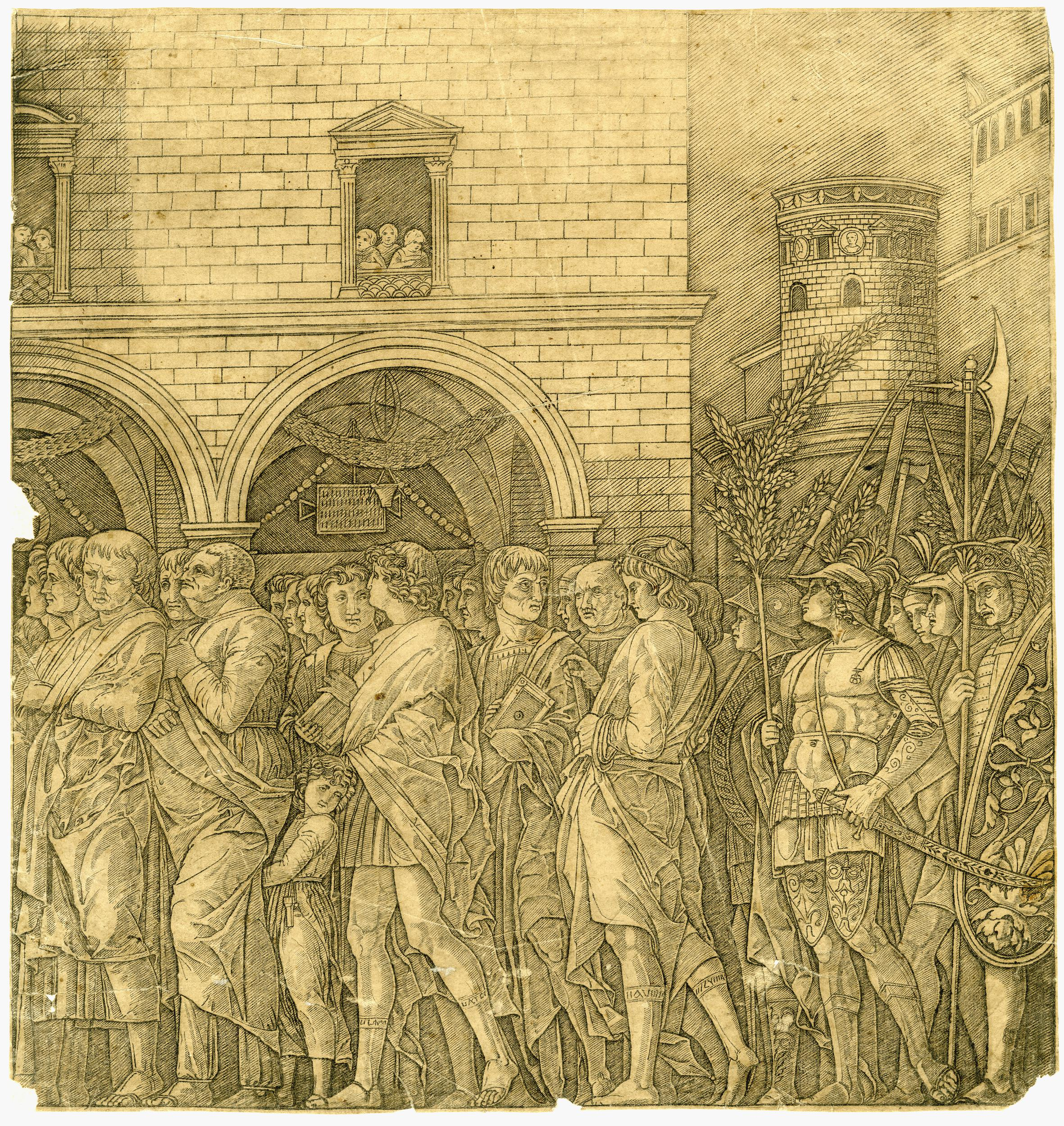
X. Senators, early print version. The 10th scene was likely in the preparatory stage when the master died in 1506. A preparatory sketch for it must have already existed. A drawing executed from the master's original has survived and is housed in the Albertina graphic art collection in Vienna, also prints.

== Literary sources ==
This table is taken from Appendix III in Martindale (1979). The Latin texts have been replaced by English translations.

Painting and features	Plutarch – Lives	Appian – Roman History, Book VIII	Suetonius – The Twelve Caesars
	Life of Aemilius Paulus (trans. Leonardi Bruni, Rome c 1470)	Trans. Pietro Candido Decembrio, Venice c 1477	Life of Caesar
English translation	John Dryden (1683)	Horace White (writer) (Loeb,1912)	John Carew Rolfe (Loeb, 1920)
Canvas I: Picture bearers			
Trumpeters		Trumpeters led the advance and wagons laden with spoils.	
Emblems and banners	This triumph lasted three days. On the first, which was scarcely long enough for the sight, were to be seen the statues, pictures, ...		
Canvas II: Standard bearers			
Colossal statues on carts	... and colossal images which were taken from the enemy, drawn upon two hundred and fifty chariots.		
Model of a city, plaques with inscriptions, statues		Towers were borne along representing the captured cities, and pictures showing the exploits of the war	
Canvas III: Bearers of trophies and bullion			
Trophies of captured weapons	On the second [day] was carried in a great many wagons the finest and richest armour of the Macedonians, both of brass and steel, all newly polished and glittering the pieces of which were piled up and arranged purposely with the greatest art, so as to seem to be tumbled in heaps carelessly and by chance: helmets were thrown upon shields, coats of mail upon greaves; Cretan targets, and Thracian bucklers and quivers of arrows, lay huddled amongst horses' bits, and through these there appeared the points of naked swords, intermixed with long Macedonian sarissas.		
Bearers of booty and coins	After these wagons loaded with armour there followed three thousand men who carried the silver that was coined, in seven hundred and fifty vessels, each of which weighed three talents, and was carried by four men.	then gold and silver coin and bullion, and whatever else they had captured of that kind	
Canvas IV: Vase bearers			
Bearers of booty and crowns	Others brought silver bowls and goblets and cups, all disposed in such order as to make the best show, and all curious as well for their size as the solidity of their embossed work.	then came the crowns that had been given to the general as a reward for his bravery by cities, by allies, or by the army itself.	
White oxen		White oxen came next, ...	
Canvas V: Elephants			
Trumpeters, white oxen	On the third day, early in the morning, first came the trumpeters, who did not sound as they were wont in a procession or solemn entry, but such a charge as the Romans use when they encourage the soldiers to fight. Next followed young men wearing frocks with ornamented borders, who led to the sacrifice a hundred and twenty stalled oxen, with their horns gilded, and their heads adorned with ribbons and garlands; and with these were boys that carried basins for libation, of silver and gold.		
Elephants with candelabras		and after them elephants	and he mounted the Capitol by torchlight, with forty elephants bearing lamps on his right and his left.
Canvas VI: Corselet bearers			
Bearers of booty and coins, trophies of arms	After this was brought the gold coin, which was divided into vessels that weighed three talents, like those that contained the silver; they were in number seventy-seven. These were followed by those that brought the consecrated bowl which Aemilius had caused to be made, that weighed ten talents, and was set with precious stones. Then were exposed to view the cups of Antigonus and Seleucus, and those of the Thericlean make, and all the gold plate that was used at Perseus's table. Next to these came Perseus's chariot, in which his armour was placed, and on that his diadem.		
Canvas VII: Captives			
Captives, buffoons	And, after a little intermission, the king's children were led captives, and with them a train of their attendants, masters, and teachers, all shedding tears, and stretching out hands to the spectators, and making the children themselves also beg and entreat their compassion. There were two sons and a daughter, whose tender age made them but little sensible of the greatness of their misery, which very insensibility of their condition rendered it the more deplorable; insomuch that Perseus himself was scarcely regarded as he went along, whilst pity fixed the eyes of the Romans upon the infants; and many of them could not forbear tears, and all beheld the sight with a mixture of sorrow and pleasure, until the children were passed.		
Canvas VIII: Musicians			
Musicians		Lietors clad in purple tunics preceded the general; also a chorus of musicians and pipers, in imitation of an Etruscan procession, wearing belts and golden crowns, and they march evenly with song and dance. They call themselves Lydi because, as I think, the Etruscans were a Lydian colony. One of these, in the middle of the procession, wearing a purple cloak and golden bracelets and necklace, caused laughter by making various gesticulations, as though he were insulting the enemy.	
Signifers	After these were carried four hundred crowns, all made of gold, sent from the cities by their respective deputations to Aemilius, in honour of his victory.	Next came incense bearers.	
Canvas IX: Julius Caesar			
Caesar in his chariot	Then he himself came, seated on a chariot magnificently adorned (a man well worthy to be looked at, even without these ensigns of power), dressed in a robe of purple, interwoven with gold, and holding a laurel branch in his right hand.	... and after them the general himself on a chariot embellished with various designs, wearing a crown of gold and precious stones, and dressed, according to the fashion of the country, in a purple toga embroidered with golden stars. He bore a sceptre of ivory, and a laurel branch, which is always the Roman symbol of victory. Riding in the same chariot with him were boys and girls, and on horses on either side of him young men, his own relatives. Then followed those who had served him in the war as secretaries, aids, and armor-bearers.	In his Pontic triumph he displayed among the show-pieces of the procession an inscription of but three words, "I came, I saw, I conquered" – Veni, vidi, vici
Engraving: Senators			
Senators	All the army, in like manner, with boughs of laurel in their hands, divided into their hands and companies, followed the chariot of their commander; some singing verses, according to the usual custom, mingled with raillery; others, songs of triumph and the praise of Aemilius's deeds.	After these came the army arranged in companies and cohorts, all of them crowned and carrying laurel branches, the bravest of them bearing their military prizes. They praised some of their captains, derided others, and reproached others; for in a triumph everybody is free, and is allowed to say what he pleases.	
