= Jost Bürgi =

Swiss clock and instrument maker (1552–1632)

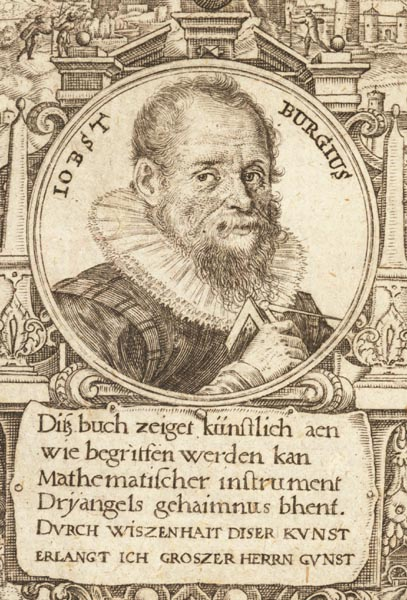
- Born: 28 February 1552; Lichtensteig, Toggenburg, Switzerland
- Died: 31 January 1632 (aged 79); Kassel, Landgraviate of Hesse-Kassel, Holy Roman Empire
- Known for: Geometric progressions Logarithms
- Scientific career
- Fields: Horology, mathematics

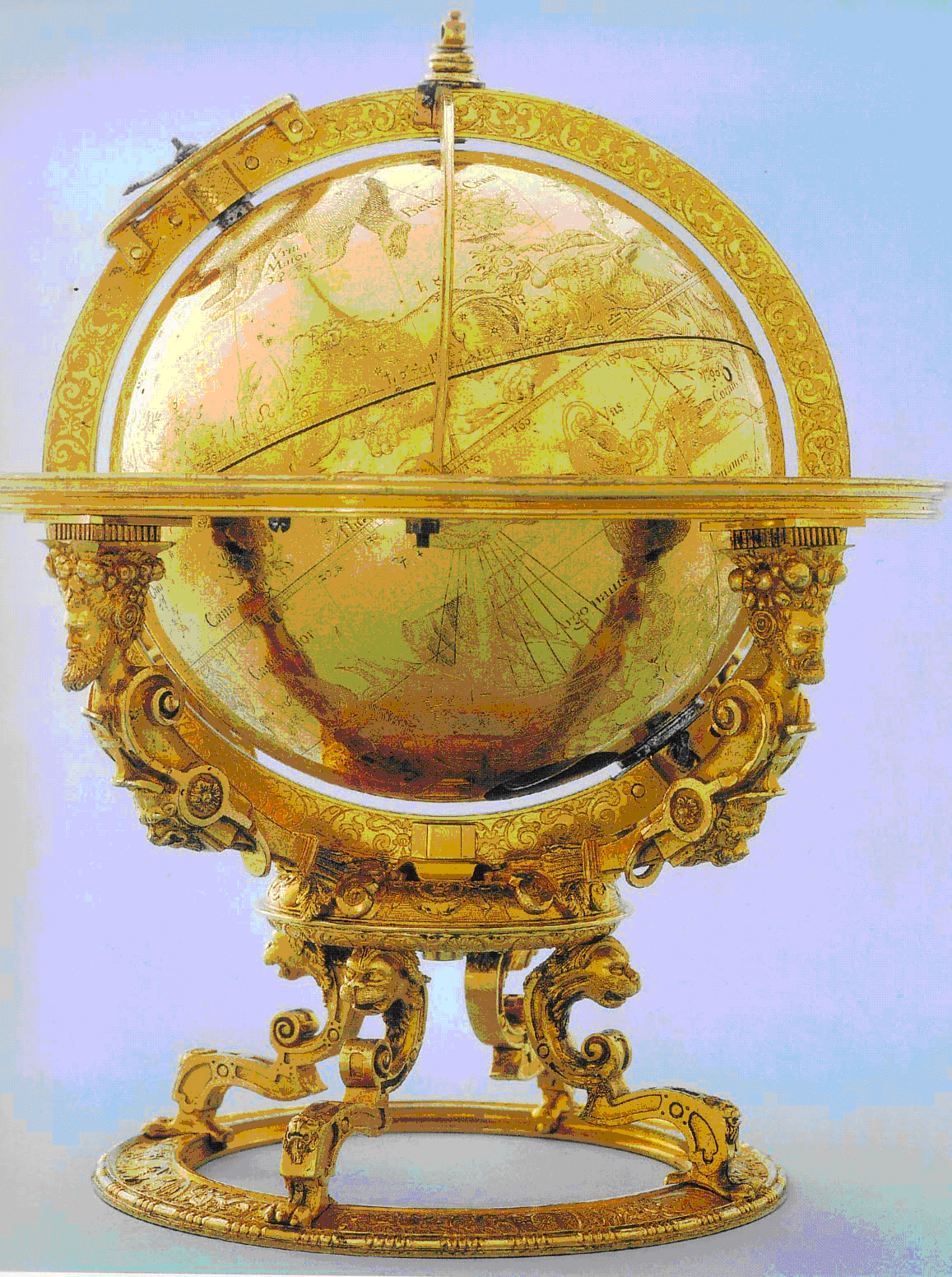
Mechanised Celestial Globe, made 1594 in Kassel, now at Schweizerisches Landesmuseum in Zurich

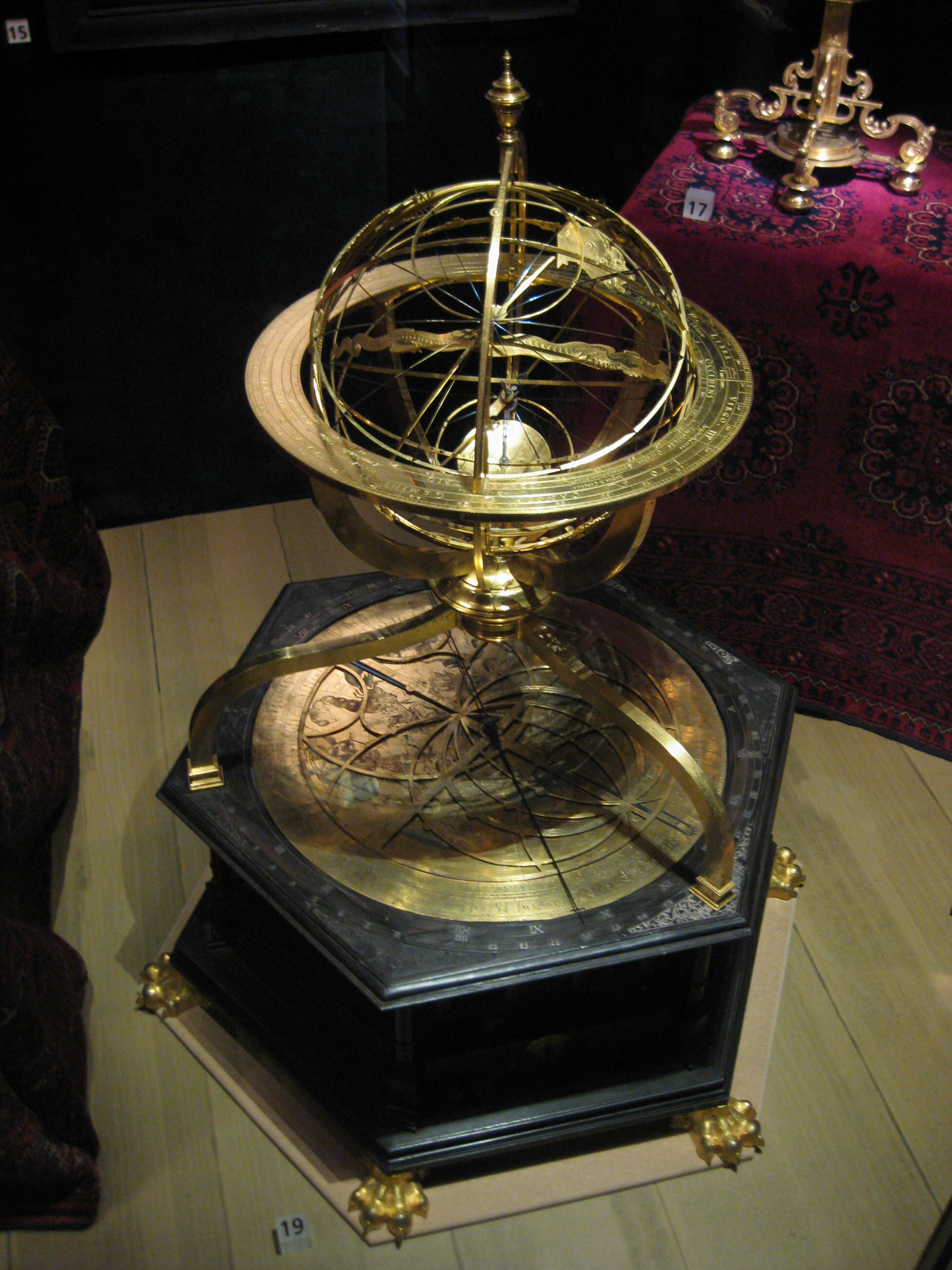
Jost Bürgi and Antonius Eisenhoit: Armillary sphere with astronomical clock, made 1585 in Kassel, now at Nordiska Museet in Stockholm

Medal issued on the 350th anniversary of his death

Jost Bürgi (Swiss Standard German: [ˈbʏrɡi]; also Joost, Jobst; Latinized surname Burgius or Byrgius; 28 February 1552 – 31 January 1632), active primarily at the courts in Kassel and Prague, was a Swiss clockmaker, mathematician, and writer. Burgi was the brother-in-law and adoptive father of Benjamin Bramer.

== Early life and education ==
Bürgi was born in 1552 Lichtensteig, Toggenburg, at the time a subject territory of the Abbey of St. Gall (now part of the canton of St. Gallen, Switzerland).

Not much is known about his life or education before his employment as astronomer and clockmaker at the court of William IV in Kassel in 1579; it has been theorized that he acquired his mathematical knowledge at Strasbourg, among others from Swiss mathematician Conrad Dasypodius, but there are no facts to support this.

== Career ==
Although an autodidact, he was already during his lifetime considered as one of the most excellent mechanical engineers of his generation. His employer, William IV, Landgrave of Hesse-Kassel, in a letter to Tycho Brahe praised Bürgi as a "second Archimedes" (quasi indagine Archimedes alter est). He was appointed court astronomer in 1591 after the departure of Christoph Rothmann to his hometown of Bernburg to study theology.

Another autodidact, Nicolaus Reimers, in 1587 translated Copernicus' De Revolutionibus Orbium Coelestium into German for Bürgi. A copy of the translation survived in Graz, it is thus called "Grazer Handschrift".

In 1604, he entered the service of emperor Rudolf II in Prague. Here, he befriended Johannes Kepler. Bürgi constructed a table of sines (Canon Sinuum), which was supposedly very accurate, but since the table itself is lost, it is difficult to be sure of its real accuracy (for instance, Valentinus Otho's Opus Palatinum had parts which were not as accurate as it was claimed). An introduction to some of Bürgi's methods survives in a copy by Kepler; it discusses the basics of Algebra (or Coss as it was known at the time), and of decimal fractions. Some authors consider Bürgi as one of the inventors of logarithms. His legacy also includes the engineering achievement contained in his innovative mechanical astronomical models. During his years in Prague he worked closely with the astronomer Johannes Kepler at the court of Rudolf II.

== Bürgi as a clockmaker ==
It is undocumented where he learned his clockmaking skills, but eventually he became the most innovative clock and scientific instrument maker of his time. Among his major horological inventions were the cross-beat escapement, and the remontoire, two mechanisms which improved the accuracy of mechanical clocks of the time by orders of magnitude. This allowed for the first time clocks to be used as scientific instruments, with enough accuracy to time the passing of stars (and other heavenly bodies) in the crosshairs of telescopes to start accurately charting stellar positions.

Working as an instrument maker for the court of William IV, Landgrave of Hesse-Kassel in Kassel he played a pivotal role in developing the first astronomical charts. He invented logarithms as a working tool for himself for his astronomical calculations, but as a "craftsman/scholar" rather than a "book scholar" he failed to publish his invention for a long time.

In 1592, Rudolf II, Holy Roman Emperor in Prague received from his uncle, the Landgrave of Hesse-Kassel, a Bürgi globe and insisted that Bürgi deliver it personally. From then on Bürgi commuted between Kassel and Prague, and finally entered the service of the emperor in 1604 to work for the imperial astronomer Johannes Kepler.

== Works ==
The most significant artifacts designed and built by Bürgi surviving in museums are:

- Several mechanized celestial globes, now located at the Musée des Arts et Métiers in Paris, the Swiss National Museum in Zürich, the Orangerie in Kassel (2 pcs., 1580–1595) and the Duchess Anna Amalia Library in Weimar
- Several clocks at the Orangerie in Kassel, the Mathematisch-Physikalischer Salon in Dresden and the Kunsthistorisches Museum in Vienna including one that incorporates a mechanised celestial globe made of quartz (Bergkristalluhr) and one displaying planetary motion (Planetenlaufuhr)
- Sextants made for Kepler at the National Technical Museum in Prague
- A mechanical model of the irregularities of the motion of the Moon around the Earth (Mond-Anomalien-Uhr) at the Orangerie in Kassel
- Mechanized armillary sphere in Upsala, Sweden

== Bürgi as a mathematician ==
=== Bürgi's work on trigonometry ===
By 1586, Bürgi was able to calculate sines at arbitrary precision, using several algorithms, one of which he called Kunstweg. He supposedly used these algorithms to calculate a «Canon Sinuum», a table of sines to 8 places in steps of 2 arc seconds. Nothing more is known on this table, and some authors have speculated that its range was only over 45 degrees. Such tables were extremely important for navigation at sea. Johannes Kepler called the Canon Sinuum the most precise known table of sines. Bürgi explained his algorithms in his work Fundamentum Astronomiae which he presented to Emperor Rudolf II in 1592.

Iterative table calculation through Bürgi's algorithm essentially works as follows: cells sum up the values of the two previous cells in the same column. The final cell's value is divided by two, and the next iteration starts. Finally, the values of the last column get normalized. Rather accurate approximations of sines are obtained after few iterations. Only recently, Folkerts et al. proved that this simple process converges indeed towards the true sines. Another of Buergi's algorithms uses differences in order to build up a table, and this was an anticipation of the famous Tables du cadastre.

=== Bürgi's work on logarithms ===
Bürgi constructed a table of progressions of what are now understood as antilogarithms (exponential functions) independently of John Napier, through a method distinct from Napier's. Napier published his discovery in 1614, and this publication was widely disseminated in Europe by the time Bürgi published at the behest of Johannes Kepler. Bürgi may have constructed his table of progressions around 1600, but Bürgi's work is not a theoretical basis for logarithms, although his table serves the same purpose as Napier's. One source claims that Bürgi did not develop a clear notion of a logarithmic function and can therefore not be viewed as an inventor of logarithms.

Bürgi's method is different from that of Napier and was clearly invented independently. Kepler wrote about Bürgi's logarithms in the introduction to his Rudolphine Tables (1627): "... as aids to calculation Justus Byrgius was led to these very logarithms many years before Napier's system appeared; but being an indolent man, and very uncommunicative, instead of rearing up his child for the public benefit he deserted it at birth."

== Honors ==
The lunar crater Byrgius is named in Bürgi's honor.
