= Ludovico Dondi =

Italian painter

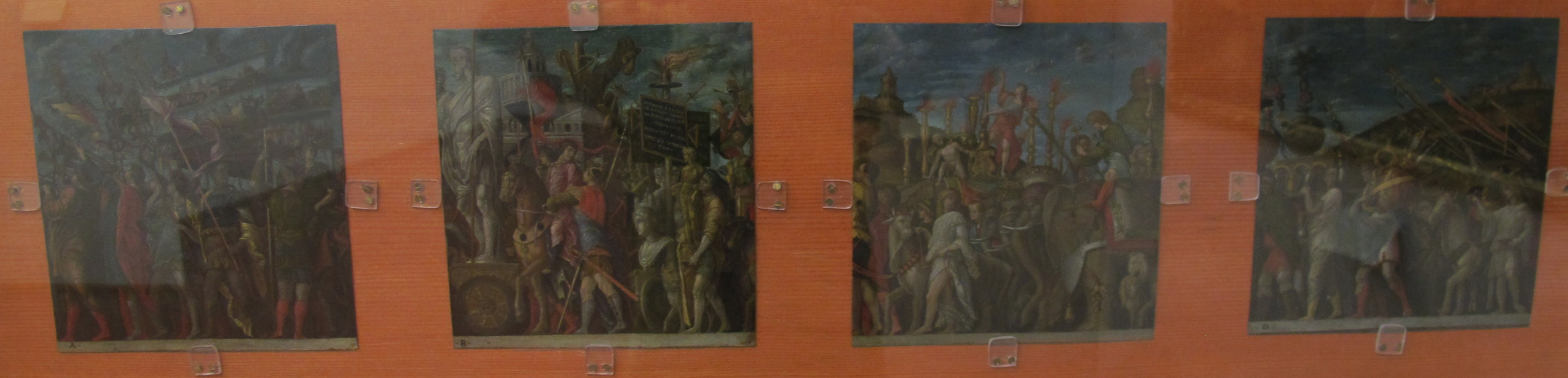
Copies by Dondi of the Mantegna's Triumphs of Caesar at Pinacoteca di Siena

Ludovico Dondi (active 1585–1614) was an Italian painter active in Mantua. He is called il Mantovano in 1840 by Romanelli. Garollo calls him Luigi Dondi. He is known for the copies he made of Andrea Mantegna's Triumphs of Caesar.
