= Canon Sinuum (Bürgi) =

Late 16th century mathematical table of sines

The Canon Sinuum was a historic table of sines thought to have given the sines to 8 sexagesimal places between 0 and 90 degrees in steps of 2 arc seconds. Some authors believe that the table was only between 0 and 45 degrees. It was created by Jost Bürgi at the end of the 16th century. Such tables were essential for navigation at sea. Johannes Kepler called the Canon Sinuum the most precise known table of sines.

This table is thought to be lost.

The Canon Sinuum was computed by Bürgi's algorithms explained in his work Fundamentum Astronomiae presented to Emperor Rudolf II. in 1592. These algorithms made use of differences and were one of the early uses of difference calculus. The largest trigonometrical table actually contained in the Fundamentum Astronomiae is a table giving the sines for every minute of the quadrant and to 5 to 7 sexagesimal places.

The manuscript of Fundamentum Astronomiae is now in the collection of the Biblioteka Uniwersytecka in Wrocław, Poland.

== See also ==
- Ptolemy's table of chords
