= Franz Brulliot =

Franz Brulliot (16 February 1780 – 13 November 1836) was an art historian, specializing in engraving. He is known particularly for his work Dictionnaire des monogrammes.

== Life and career ==
Brulliot was born in Düsseldorf in 1780. His father was Josef Brulliot (1739–1827), a professor at Düsseldorf Academy. Franz Brulliot studied under the artist Johann Peter von Langer at the Academy, and he began copper engraving. He moved to Munich in 1805, and in 1808 became Assistant to the Royal Collection of engravings, under Schmid; he gave up producing art and devoted himself to the study of engraving. He began cataloging the collection, according to Adam Bartsch's catalogue. To further his studies he travelled to cities in Germany, Italy, France and the Netherlands. From 1822, he was Conservator of the collection.

His work Dictionnaire des monogrammes, marques figurées, lettres initiales, noms abrégés etc. avec lesquels les peintres, dessinateurs, graveurs et sculpteurs ont désigné leurs noms was published in 2 volumes in Munich in 1817; there was a supplement to the work, Table Générale des Monogrammes, in 2 volumes (1820). A much revised version of Dictionnaire des monogrammes, in 3 volumes, appeared 1832–1834.

Brulliot made preparatory work for a 10-volume supplement to Bartsch's Le Peintre Graveur, before he died of cholera in Munich in 1836.
