= Nicolaus Reimers =

German astronomer and mathematician

Tychonic system

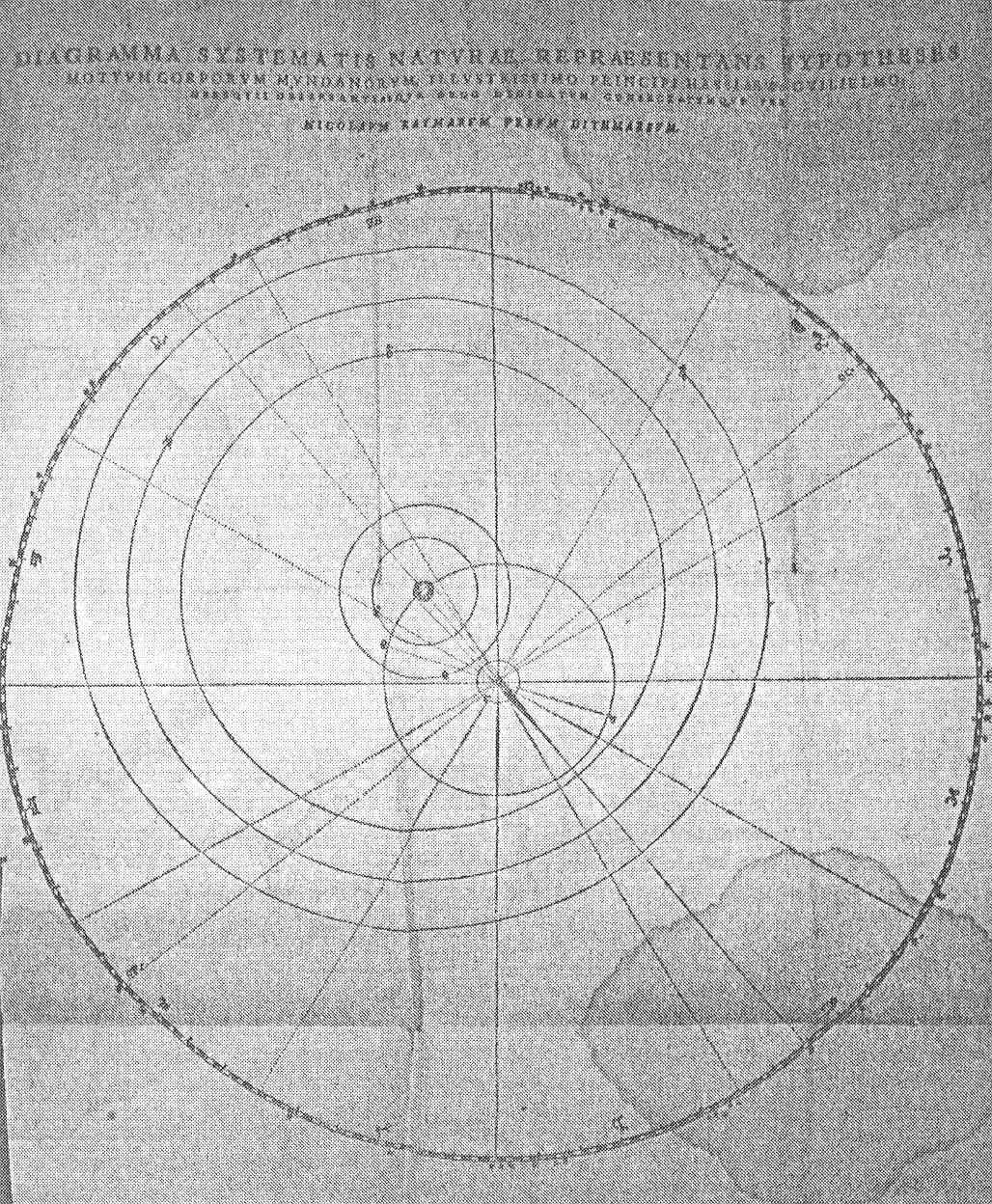
Nicolaus Reimers’ 1588 geo-heliocentric planetary model

Nicolaus Reimers Baer (2 February 1551 – 16 October 1600), also Reimarus Ursus, Nicolaus Reimers Bär or Nicolaus Reymers Baer, was a German astronomer and imperial mathematician to Emperor Rudolf II. Due to his family's background, he was also known as Bär, Latinized to Ursus ("bear").

Reimers was born in Hennstedt and received hardly any education in his youth, herding pigs until the age of 18. Yet, Heinrich Rantzau discovered his talents and employed him from 1574 to 1584 as geometer. Accordingly, Reimers in 1580 published a Latin Grammar and in 1583 his Geodaesia Ranzoviana. Rantzau also arranged a meeting with Tycho Brahe.

From 1585 to 1586 he was employed as a private tutor in Pomerania and from 1586 to 1587, Reimers stayed at the court of William IV, Landgrave of Hesse-Kassel in Kassel, where he met Swiss instrument maker Jost Bürgi (1552–1632). Both were autodidacts and thus had a similar background. As Bürgi did not understand Latin, Reimers translated Copernicus' De Revolutionibus Orbium Coelestium into German for Bürgi. A copy of the translation survived in Graz, it is thus called "Grazer Handschrift".

Reimers was a bitter rival of Tycho Brahe (his successor as imperial mathematician) after he tried to claim the Tychonic system as his own. Tycho complained that Ursus had plagiarized both his system of the world, as well as the publication of the mathematical model of prosthaphaeresis. History has sided with Ursus on the later issue, and he had stated that the technique was the invention of Paul Wittich and Jost Bürgi.

In 1588 he claimed to have devised a model of the Solar System where the planets revolved around the Sun, while the Earth only spun around on its axis. In this he differed from Copernicus, who had postulated also that the Earth orbited the Sun. Ursus objected to the Copernican model as it violated the Aristotelian principle of not allowing more than one natural movement by a body.

Johannes Kepler committed a faux pas early in his career by sending a laudatory letter to Reimers while seeking the patronage of Tycho. Ursus published the letter in the preface to his work claiming priority for Tycho's cosmological ideas.

But unlike Tycho's geoheliocentric system in which the Earth does not rotate and the Martian and Solar orbits intersect, in that of Ursus and his follower Roslin, the Earth had a daily rotation and also the Martian and Solar orbits do not intersect. Thus avoiding the conclusion in respect to the Martian orbit, that there are no solid celestial spheres, on the grounds that they cannot possibly interpenetrate. But on the other hand the orbits of Mercury and Venus would obviously intersect the Martian orbit in Reimers' illustration of his model, and indeed also intersect Jupiter's orbit.

Reimers died in Prague.

== Works ==
- "Grammatica Ranzoviana", 1580.
- Geodaesia Ranzoviana, Leipzig 1583.
- Fundamentum Astronomicum: id est. Nova doctrina sinuum et triangulorum. [Astronomical Foundation: A new doctrine of sines and triangles.], Straßburg 1588.
- Metamorphosis Logicae, Straßburg 1589.
- "Nicolai Raymari Ursi Dithmarsi Croius Puer seu Carmen Gratulatorium", Straßburg 1589.
- "Alt und auch Röm. Schreibkalender auff das Jahr 1593", Erfurt 1592.
- "Prognosticon Astrologicum dieses 1593. Jahrs", Erfurt 1592.
- "Alt und New Schreibcalender auff das Jahr 1594", Erfurt 1593.
- "Allegory to Emperor Rudolph II.", 1594.
- "Nicolai Raymari Ursi Dithmarsi Parentatio Iacobi Curtii", Prag 1594.
- Nicolai Raimari Ursi Dithmarsi de Astronomicis Hypothesibus, Prag 1597.
- Chronotheatron, Prag 1597.
- "Demonstratio Hipotheses Motuum Coelestium", Prag.
- Nicolai Raimari Ursi Dithmarsi Arithmetica Analytica vulgo Cosa oder Algebra, Frankfurt/Oder 1601.
- "Nicolai Raimari Ursi Ditmarsi Chronologische Beweisung", posthum Nürnberg 1606, Schleswig 1606, Schleswig 1666.
