= List of integrals of trigonometric functions =

The following is a list of integrals (antiderivative functions) of trigonometric functions. For antiderivatives involving both exponential and trigonometric functions, see List of integrals of exponential functions. For a complete list of antiderivative functions, see Lists of integrals. For the special antiderivatives involving trigonometric functions, see Trigonometric integral.

Generally, if the function $\sin x$ is any trigonometric function, and $\cos x$ is its derivative,

$$\int a\cos nx\,dx = \frac{a}{n}\sin nx+C$$

In all formulas the constant a is assumed to be nonzero, and C denotes the constant of integration.

== Integrands involving only sine ==
- $\int\sin ax\,dx = -\frac{1}{a}\cos ax+C$
- $\int\sin^2 {ax}\,dx = \frac{x}{2} - \frac{1}{4a} \sin 2ax +C= \frac{x}{2} - \frac{1}{2a} \sin ax\cos ax +C$
- $\int\sin^3 {ax}\,dx = \frac{\cos 3ax}{12a} - \frac{3 \cos ax}{4a} +C$
- $\int x\sin^2 {ax}\,dx = \frac{x^2}{4} - \frac{x}{4a} \sin 2ax - \frac{1}{8a^2} \cos 2ax +C$
- $\int x^2\sin^2 {ax}\,dx = \frac{x^3}{6} - \left( \frac {x^2}{4a} - \frac{1}{8a^3} \right) \sin 2ax - \frac{x}{4a^2} \cos 2ax +C$
- $\int x\sin ax\,dx = \frac{\sin ax}{a^2}-\frac{x\cos ax}{a}+C$
- $\int(\sin b_1x)(\sin b_2x)\,dx = \frac{\sin((b_2-b_1)x)}{2(b_2-b_1)}-\frac{\sin((b_1+b_2)x)}{2(b_1+b_2)}+C \qquad\mbox{(for }|b_1|\neq|b_2|\mbox{)}$
- $\int\sin^n {ax}\,dx = -\frac{\sin^{n-1} ax\cos ax}{na} + \frac{n-1}{n}\int\sin^{n-2} ax\,dx \qquad\mbox{(for }n>0\mbox{)}$
- $\int\frac{dx}{\sin ax} = -\frac{1}{a}\ln{\left| \csc{ax}+\cot{ax}\right|}+C = \frac{1}{a} \ln {\left| \tan \frac{ax}{2} \right|} + C$
- $\int\frac{dx}{\sin^n ax} = \frac{\cos ax}{a(1-n) \sin^{n-1} ax}+\frac{n-2}{n-1}\int\frac{dx}{\sin^{n-2}ax} \qquad\mbox{(for }n>1\mbox{)}$
- $$\begin{align}
\int x^n\sin ax\,dx &= -\frac{x^n}{a}\cos ax+\frac{n}{a}\int x^{n-1}\cos ax\,dx \\
&= \sum_{k=0}^{2k\leq n} (-1)^{k+1} \frac{x^{n-2k}}{a^{1+2k}}\frac{n!}{(n-2k)!} \cos ax +\sum_{k=0}^{2k+1\leq n}(-1)^k \frac{x^{n-1-2k}}{a^{2+2k}}\frac{n!}{(n-2k-1)!} \sin ax \\
&= - \sum_{k=0}^n \frac{x^{n-k}}{a^{1+k}}\frac{n!}{(n-k)!}\cos\left(ax+k\frac{\pi}{2}\right)  \qquad\mbox{(for }n>0\mbox{)}
\end{align}$$
- $\int\frac{\sin ax}{x}\,dx = \sum_{n=0}^\infty (-1)^n\frac{(ax)^{2n+1}}{(2n+1)\cdot (2n+1)!} +C$
- $\int\frac{\sin ax}{x^n}\,dx = -\frac{\sin ax}{(n-1)x^{n-1}} + \frac{a}{n-1}\int\frac{\cos ax}{x^{n-1}}\,dx$
- $$\int \sin{(ax^2 + bx + c)} \, {dx} = \sqrt{\frac{\pi a}{2}} \cdot \begin{cases}
\displaystyle \cos\left(\frac{\Delta}{4a}\right) S{\left(\frac{2ax + b}{\sqrt{2a\pi}}\right)} + \sin\left(\frac{\Delta}{4a}\right) C{\left(\frac{2ax + b}{\sqrt{2a\pi}}\right)}, & \Delta > 0 \\
\displaystyle \cos\left(\frac{\Delta}{4a}\right) S{\left(\frac{2ax + b}{\sqrt{2a\pi}}\right)}-\sin\left(\frac{\Delta}{4a}\right) C{\left(\frac{2ax + b}{\sqrt{2a\pi}}\right)}, & \Delta < 0
\end{cases}$$
  where $\Delta = b^2 - 4ac$ and $a > 0$.
- $\int\frac{dx}{1\pm\sin ax} = \frac{1}{a}\tan\left(\frac{ax}{2}\mp\frac{\pi}{4}\right)+C$
- $\int\frac{x\,dx}{1+\sin ax} = \frac{x}{a}\tan\left(\frac{ax}{2} - \frac{\pi}{4}\right)+\frac{2}{a^2}\ln\left|\cos\left(\frac{ax}{2}-\frac{\pi}{4}\right)\right|+C$
- $\int\frac{x\,dx}{1-\sin ax} = \frac{x}{a}\cot\left(\frac{\pi}{4} - \frac{ax}{2}\right)+\frac{2}{a^2}\ln\left|\sin\left(\frac{\pi}{4}-\frac{ax}{2}\right)\right|+C$
- $\int\frac{\sin ax\,dx}{1\pm\sin ax} = \pm x+\frac{1}{a}\tan\left(\frac{\pi}{4}\mp\frac{ax}{2}\right)+C$

== Integrands involving only cosine ==
- $\int\cos ax\,dx = \frac{1}{a}\sin ax+C$
- $\int\cos^2 {ax}\,dx = \frac{x}{2} + \frac{1}{4a} \sin 2ax +C = \frac{x}{2} + \frac{1}{2a} \sin ax\cos ax +C$
- $\int\cos^n ax\,dx = \frac{\cos^{n-1} ax\sin ax}{na} + \frac{n-1}{n}\int\cos^{n-2} ax\,dx \qquad\mbox{(for }n>0\mbox{)}$
- $\int x\cos ax\,dx = \frac{\cos ax}{a^2} + \frac{x\sin ax}{a}+C$
- $\int x^2\cos^2 {ax}\,dx = \frac{x^3}{6} + \left( \frac {x^2}{4a} - \frac{1}{8a^3} \right) \sin 2ax + \frac{x}{4a^2} \cos 2ax +C$
- $$\begin{align}
\int x^n\cos ax\,dx &= \frac{x^n\sin ax}{a} - \frac{n}{a}\int x^{n-1}\sin ax\,dx \\
&= \sum_{k=0}^{2k+1\leq n} (-1)^{k} \frac{x^{n-2k-1}}{a^{2+2k}}\frac{n!}{(n-2k-1)!} \cos ax +\sum_{k=0}^{2k\leq n}(-1)^{k} \frac{x^{n-2k}}{a^{1+2k}}\frac{n!}{(n-2k)!} \sin ax \\
&=\sum_{k=0}^n (-1)^{\lfloor k/2 \rfloor} \frac{x^{n-k}}{a^{1+k}}\frac{n!}{(n-k)!}\cos\left(ax -\frac{(-1)^k+1}{2}\frac{\pi}{2}\right) \\
&=\sum_{k=0}^n \frac{x^{n-k}}{a^{1+k}}\frac{n!}{(n-k)!}\sin\left(ax+k\frac{\pi}{2}\right)  \qquad\mbox{(for }n>0\mbox{)}
\end{align}$$
- $\int\frac{\cos ax}{x}\,dx = \ln|ax|+\sum_{k=1}^\infty (-1)^k\frac{(ax)^{2k}}{2k\cdot(2k)!}+C$
- $\int\frac{\cos ax}{x^n}\,dx = -\frac{\cos ax}{(n-1)x^{n-1}}-\frac{a}{n-1}\int\frac{\sin ax}{x^{n-1}}\,dx \qquad\mbox{(for }n\neq 1\mbox{)}$
- $\int\frac{dx}{\cos ax} = \frac{1}{a}\ln\left|\tan\left(\frac{ax}{2}+\frac{\pi}{4}\right)\right|+C = \frac{1}{a} \ln \left| \sec ax + \tan ax\right|+C$
- $\int\frac{dx}{\cos^n ax} = \frac{\sin ax}{a(n-1) \cos^{n-1} ax} + \frac{n-2}{n-1}\int\frac{dx}{\cos^{n-2} ax} \qquad\mbox{(for }n>1\mbox{)}$
- $\int\frac{dx}{1+\cos ax} = \frac{1}{a}\tan\frac{ax}{2}+C$
- $\int\frac{dx}{1-\cos ax} = -\frac{1}{a}\cot\frac{ax}{2}+C$
- $\int\frac{x\,dx}{1+\cos ax} = \frac{x}{a}\tan\frac{ax}{2} + \frac{2}{a^2}\ln\left|\cos\frac{ax}{2}\right|+C$
- $\int\frac{x\,dx}{1-\cos ax} = -\frac{x}{a}\cot\frac{ax}{2}+\frac{2}{a^2}\ln\left|\sin\frac{ax}{2}\right|+C$
- $\int\frac{\cos ax\,dx}{1+\cos ax} = x - \frac{1}{a}\tan\frac{ax}{2}+C$
- $\int\frac{\cos ax\,dx}{1-\cos ax} = -x-\frac{1}{a}\cot\frac{ax}{2}+C$
- $\int(\cos a_1x)(\cos a_2x)\,dx = \frac{\sin((a_2-a_1)x)}{2(a_2-a_1)}+\frac{\sin((a_2+a_1)x)}{2(a_2+a_1)}+C \qquad\mbox{(for }|a_1|\neq|a_2|\mbox{)}$

== Integrands involving only tangent ==
- $\int\tan ax\,dx = -\frac{1}{a}\ln|\cos ax|+C = \frac{1}{a}\ln|\sec ax|+C$
- $\int \tan^2{x} \, dx = \tan{x} - x +C$
- $\int\tan^n ax\,dx = \frac{1}{a(n-1)}\tan^{n-1} ax-\int\tan^{n-2} ax\,dx \qquad\mbox{(for }n\neq 1\mbox{)}$
- $\int\frac{dx}{q \tan ax + p} = \frac{1}{p^2 + q^2}(px + \frac{q}{a}\ln|q\sin ax + p\cos ax|)+C \qquad\mbox{(for }p^2 + q^2\neq 0\mbox{)}$
- $\int\frac{dx}{\tan ax \pm 1} = \pm \frac{x}{2} + \frac{1}{2a}\ln|\sin ax \pm \cos ax|+C$
- $\int\frac{\tan ax\,dx}{\tan ax \pm 1} = \frac{x}{2} \mp \frac{1}{2a}\ln|\sin ax \pm \cos ax|+C$

== Integrands involving only secant ==
- $\int \sec{ax} \, dx = \frac{1}{a}\ln{\left| \sec{ax} + \tan{ax}\right|}+C= \frac{1}{a}\ln{\left| \tan{\left(\frac{ax}{2} + \frac{\pi}{4} \right)}\right|}+C = \frac{1}{a}\operatorname{artanh}{\left(\sin{ax}\right)}+C$
- $\int \sec^2{x} \, dx = \tan{x}+C$
- $\int \sec^3{x} \, dx = \frac{1}{2}\sec x \tan x + \frac{1}{2}\ln|\sec x + \tan x| + C.$
- $\int \sec^n{ax} \, dx = \frac{\sec^{n-2}{ax} \tan {ax}}{a(n-1)} \,+\, \frac{n-2}{n-1}\int \sec^{n-2}{ax} \, dx \qquad \mbox{ (for }n \ne 1\mbox{)}$
- $\int \frac{dx}{\sec{x} + 1} = x - \tan{\frac{x}{2}}+C$
- $\int \frac{dx}{\sec{x} - 1} = - x - \cot{\frac{x}{2}}+C$

== Integrands involving only cosecant ==
- $\int \csc{ax} \, dx= -\frac{1}{a}\ln{\left| \csc{ax}+\cot{ax}\right|}+C= \frac{1}{a}\ln{\left| \csc{ax}-\cot{ax}\right|}+C = \frac{1}{a}\ln{\left| \tan{\left( \frac{ax}{2} \right)}\right|}+C$
- $\int \csc^2{x} \, dx = -\cot{x}+C$
- $\int \csc^3{x} \, dx = -\frac{1}{2}\csc x \cot x - \frac{1}{2}\ln|\csc x + \cot x| + C = -\frac{1}{2}\csc x \cot x + \frac{1}{2}\ln|\csc x - \cot x| + C$
- $\int \csc^n{ax} \, dx = -\frac{\csc^{n-2}{ax} \cot{ax}}{a(n-1)} \,+\, \frac{n-2}{n-1}\int \csc^{n-2}{ax} \, dx \qquad \mbox{ (for }n \ne 1\mbox{)}$
- $\int \frac{dx}{\csc{x} + 1} = x - \frac{2}{\cot{\frac{x}{2}}+1}+C$
- $\int \frac{dx}{\csc{x} - 1} = - x + \frac{2}{\cot{\frac{x}{2}}-1}+C$

== Integrands involving only cotangent ==
- $\int\cot ax\,dx = \frac{1}{a}\ln|\sin ax|+C$
- $\int \cot^2{x} \, dx = -\cot{x} - x +C$
- $\int\cot^n ax\,dx = -\frac{1}{a(n-1)}\cot^{n-1} ax - \int\cot^{n-2} ax\,dx \qquad\mbox{(for }n\neq 1\mbox{)}$
- $\int\frac{dx}{1 + \cot ax} = \int\frac{\tan ax\,dx}{\tan ax+1} = \frac{x}{2} - \frac{1}{2a}\ln|\sin ax + \cos ax|+C$
- $\int\frac{dx}{1 - \cot ax} = \int\frac{\tan ax\,dx}{\tan ax-1} = \frac{x}{2} + \frac{1}{2a}\ln|\sin ax - \cos ax|+C$

== Integrands involving both sine and cosine ==
An integral that is a rational function of the sine and cosine can be evaluated using Bioche's rules.

- $\int\frac{dx}{\cos ax\pm\sin ax} = \frac{1}{a\sqrt{2}}\ln\left|\tan\left(\frac{ax}{2}\pm\frac{\pi}{8}\right)\right|+C$
- $\int\frac{dx}{(\cos ax\pm\sin ax)^2} = \frac{1}{2a}\tan\left(ax\mp\frac{\pi}{4}\right)+C$
- $\int\frac{dx}{(\cos x + \sin x)^n} = \frac{1}{2(n-1)}\left(\frac{\sin x - \cos x}{(\cos x + \sin x)^{n - 1}} + (n - 2)\int\frac{dx}{(\cos x + \sin x)^{n-2}} \right)$
- $\int\frac{\cos ax\,dx}{\cos ax + \sin ax} = \frac{x}{2} + \frac{1}{2a}\ln\left|\sin ax + \cos ax\right|+C$
- $\int\frac{\cos ax\,dx}{\cos ax - \sin ax} = \frac{x}{2} - \frac{1}{2a}\ln\left|\sin ax - \cos ax\right|+C$
- $\int\frac{\sin ax\,dx}{\cos ax + \sin ax} = \frac{x}{2} - \frac{1}{2a}\ln\left|\sin ax + \cos ax\right|+C$
- $\int\frac{\sin ax\,dx}{\cos ax - \sin ax} = -\frac{x}{2} - \frac{1}{2a}\ln\left|\sin ax - \cos ax\right|+C$
- $\int\frac{\cos ax\,dx}{(\sin ax)(1+\cos ax)} = -\frac{1}{4a}\tan^2\frac{ax}{2}+\frac{1}{2a}\ln\left|\tan\frac{ax}{2}\right|+C$
- $\int\frac{\cos ax\,dx}{(\sin ax)(1-\cos ax)} = -\frac{1}{4a}\cot^2\frac{ax}{2}-\frac{1}{2a}\ln\left|\tan\frac{ax}{2}\right|+C$
- $\int\frac{\sin ax\,dx}{(\cos ax)(1+\sin ax)} = \frac{1}{4a}\cot^2\left(\frac{ax}{2}+\frac{\pi}{4}\right)+\frac{1}{2a}\ln\left|\tan\left(\frac{ax}{2}+\frac{\pi}{4}\right)\right|+C$
- $\int\frac{\sin ax\,dx}{(\cos ax)(1-\sin ax)} = \frac{1}{4a}\tan^2\left(\frac{ax}{2}+\frac{\pi}{4}\right)-\frac{1}{2a}\ln\left|\tan\left(\frac{ax}{2}+\frac{\pi}{4}\right)\right|+C$
- $\int(\sin ax)(\cos ax)\,dx = \frac{1}{2a}\sin^2 ax +C$
- $\int(\sin a_1x)(\cos a_2x)\,dx = -\frac{\cos((a_1-a_2)x)}{2(a_1-a_2)} -\frac{\cos((a_1+a_2)x)}{2(a_1+a_2)} +C\qquad\mbox{(for }|a_1|\neq|a_2|\mbox{)}$
- $\int(\sin^n ax)(\cos ax)\,dx = \frac{1}{a(n+1)}\sin^{n+1} ax +C\qquad\mbox{(for }n\neq -1\mbox{)}$
- $\int(\sin ax)(\cos^n ax)\,dx = -\frac{1}{a(n+1)}\cos^{n+1} ax +C\qquad\mbox{(for }n\neq -1\mbox{)}$
- $$\begin{align}
\int(\sin^n ax)(\cos^m ax)\,dx &= -\frac{(\sin^{n-1} ax)(\cos^{m+1} ax)}{a(n+m)}+\frac{n-1}{n+m}\int(\sin^{n-2} ax)(\cos^m ax)\,dx  \qquad\mbox{(for }m,n>0\mbox{)} \\
&= \frac{(\sin^{n+1} ax)(\cos^{m-1} ax)}{a(n+m)} + \frac{m-1}{n+m}\int(\sin^n ax)(\cos^{m-2} ax)\,dx \qquad\mbox{(for }m,n>0\mbox{)}
\end{align}$$
- $\int\frac{dx}{(\sin ax)(\cos ax)} = \frac{1}{a}\ln\left|\tan ax\right|+C$
- $\int\frac{dx}{(\sin ax)(\cos^n ax)} = \frac{1}{a(n-1)\cos^{n-1} ax}+\int\frac{dx}{(\sin ax)(\cos^{n-2} ax)} \qquad\mbox{(for }n\neq 1\mbox{)}$
- $\int\frac{dx}{(\sin^n ax)(\cos ax)} = -\frac{1}{a(n-1)\sin^{n-1} ax}+\int\frac{dx}{(\sin^{n-2} ax)(\cos ax)} \qquad\mbox{(for }n\neq 1\mbox{)}$
- $\int\frac{\sin ax\,dx}{\cos^n ax} = \frac{1}{a(n-1)\cos^{n-1} ax} +C\qquad\mbox{(for }n\neq 1\mbox{)}$
- $\int\frac{\sin^2 ax\,dx}{\cos ax} = -\frac{1}{a}\sin ax+\frac{1}{a}\ln\left|\tan\left(\frac{\pi}{4}+\frac{ax}{2}\right)\right|+C$
- $\int\frac{\sin^2 ax\,dx}{\cos^n ax} = \frac{\sin ax}{a(n-1)\cos^{n-1}ax}-\frac{1}{n-1}\int\frac{dx}{\cos^{n-2}ax} \qquad\mbox{(for }n\neq 1\mbox{)}$
- $$\begin{align}
\int \frac{\sin^2 x}{1 + \cos^2 x} \, dx
&= \sqrt{2}\arctan\left(\frac{\tan x}{\sqrt{2}}\right) - x &\mbox{for } {-\frac{\pi}{2}} < x < \frac{\pi}{2}\\
&= \sqrt{2}\arctan\left(\frac{\tan x}{\sqrt{2}}\right) - \arctan\left(\tan x\right) &\mbox{for any real } x
\end{align}$$
- $\int\frac{\sin^n ax\,dx}{\cos ax} = -\frac{\sin^{n-1} ax}{a(n-1)} + \int\frac{\sin^{n-2} ax\,dx}{\cos ax} \qquad\mbox{(for }n\neq 1\mbox{)}$
- $$\int\frac{\sin^n ax\,dx}{\cos^m ax} = \begin{cases}
\frac{\sin^{n+1} ax}{a(m-1)\cos^{m-1} ax}-\frac{n-m+2}{m-1}\int\frac{\sin^n ax\,dx}{\cos^{m-2} ax} &\mbox{(for }m\neq 1\mbox{)} \\
\frac{\sin^{n-1} ax}{a(m-1)\cos^{m-1} ax}-\frac{n-1}{m-1}\int\frac{\sin^{n-2} ax\,dx}{\cos^{m-2} ax} &\mbox{(for }m\neq 1\mbox{)} \\
-\frac{\sin^{n-1} ax}{a(n-m)\cos^{m-1} ax}+\frac{n-1}{n-m}\int\frac{\sin^{n-2} ax\,dx}{\cos^m ax} &\mbox{(for }m\neq n\mbox{)}
\end{cases}$$
- $\int\frac{\cos ax\,dx}{\sin^n ax} = -\frac{1}{a(n-1)\sin^{n-1} ax} +C\qquad\mbox{(for }n\neq 1\mbox{)}$
- $\int\frac{\cos^2 ax\,dx}{\sin ax} = \frac{1}{a}\left(\cos ax+\ln\left|\tan\frac{ax}{2}\right|\right) +C$
- $\int\frac{\cos^2 ax\,dx}{\sin^n ax} = -\frac{1}{n-1}\left(\frac{\cos ax}{a\sin^{n-1} ax}+\int\frac{dx}{\sin^{n-2} ax}\right) \qquad\mbox{(for }n\neq 1\mbox{)}$
- $$\int\frac{\cos^n ax\,dx}{\sin^m ax} = \begin{cases}
-\frac{\cos^{n+1} ax}{a(m-1)\sin^{m-1} ax} - \frac{n-m+2}{m-1}\int\frac{\cos^n ax\,dx}{\sin^{m-2} ax} &\mbox{(for }n\neq 1\mbox{)} \\
-\frac{\cos^{n-1} ax}{a(m-1)\sin^{m-1} ax} - \frac{n-1}{m-1}\int\frac{\cos^{n-2} ax\,dx}{\sin^{m-2} ax} &\mbox{(for }m\neq 1\mbox{)} \\
\frac{\cos^{n-1} ax}{a(n-m)\sin^{m-1} ax} + \frac{n-1}{n-m}\int\frac{\cos^{n-2} ax\,dx}{\sin^m ax} &\mbox{(for }m\neq n\mbox{)}
\end{cases}$$

== Integrands involving both sine and tangent ==
- $\int (\sin ax)(\tan ax)\,dx = \frac{1}{a}(\ln|\sec ax + \tan ax| - \sin ax)+C$
- $\int\frac{\tan^n ax\,dx}{\sin^2 ax} = \frac{1}{a(n-1)}\tan^{n-1} (ax) +C\qquad\mbox{(for }n\neq 1\mbox{)}$

== Integrand involving both cosine and tangent ==
- $\int\frac{\tan^n ax\,dx}{\cos^2 ax} = \frac{1}{a(n+1)}\tan^{n+1} ax +C\qquad\mbox{(for }n\neq -1\mbox{)}$

== Integrand involving both sine and cotangent ==
- $\int\frac{\cot^n ax\,dx}{\sin^2 ax} = -\frac{1}{a(n+1)}\cot^{n+1} ax +C\qquad\mbox{(for }n\neq -1\mbox{)}$

== Integrand involving both cosine and cotangent ==
- $\int\frac{\cot^n ax\,dx}{\cos^2 ax} = \frac{1}{a(1-n)}\tan^{1-n} ax +C\qquad\mbox{(for }n\neq 1\mbox{)}$

== Integrand involving both secant and tangent ==
- $\int(\sec x)(\tan x)\,dx= \sec x + C$

== Integrand involving both cosecant and cotangent ==
- $\int(\csc x)(\cot x)\,dx= -\csc x + C$

== Integrals in a quarter period ==
Using the beta function $B(a,b)$ one can write

- $$\int_{{0}}^{{\frac{\pi}{2}}} \sin^n x \, dx = \int_{{0}}^{{\frac{\pi}{2}}} \cos^n x \, dx = \frac{1}{2} B\left( \frac{n+1}{2}, \frac{1}{2}\right) = \begin{cases}
\frac{n-1}{n} \cdot \frac{n-3}{n-2} \cdots \frac{3}{4} \cdot \frac{1}{2} \cdot \frac{\pi}{2}, & \text{if } n\text{ is even} \\
\frac{n-1}{n} \cdot \frac{n-3}{n-2} \cdots \frac{4}{5} \cdot \frac{2}{3}, & \text{if } n\text{ is odd and more than 1} \\
1, & \text{if } n=1
\end{cases}$$

Using the modified Struve functions $L_{\alpha}(x)$ and modified Bessel functions $I_{\alpha}(x)$ one can write

- $\int_{{0}}^{{\frac{\pi}{2}}} \exp(k \cdot \sin(x)) \, dx = \frac{\pi}{2} \left(I_0(k) + L_0(k) \right)$

== Integrals with symmetric limits ==
- $\int_{{-c}}^{{c}}\sin{x}\,dx = 0$
- $\int_{{-c}}^{{c}}\cos {x}\,dx = 2\int_{{0}}^{{c}}\cos {x}\,dx = 2\int_{{-c}}^{{0}}\cos {x}\,dx = 2\sin {c}$
- $\int_{{-c}}^{{c}}\tan {x}\,dx = 0$
- $\int_{-\frac{a}{2}}^{\frac{a}{2}} x^2\cos^2 {\frac{n\pi x}{a}}\,dx = \frac{a^3(n^2\pi^2-6)}{24n^2\pi^2} \qquad\mbox{(for }n=1,3,5...\mbox{)}$
- $\int_{\frac{-a}{2}}^{\frac{a}{2}} x^2\sin^2 {\frac{n\pi x}{a}}\,dx = \frac{a^3(n^2\pi^2-6(-1)^n)}{24n^2\pi^2} = \frac{a^3}{24} (1-6\frac{(-1)^n}{n^2\pi^2}) \qquad\mbox{(for }n=1,2,3,...\mbox{)}$

== Integral over a full circle ==
- $\int_{{0}}^{{2 \pi}}\sin^{2m+1}{x}\cos^{n}{x}\,dx = 0 \! \qquad n,m \in \mathbb{Z}$
- $\int_{{0}}^{{2 \pi}}\sin^{m}{x}\cos^{2n+1}{x}\,dx = 0 \! \qquad n,m \in \mathbb{Z}$

== See also ==
- Trigonometric integral
