= Bioche's rules =

Aids the computation of indefinite integrals involving sines and cosines

Bioche's rules, formulated by the French mathematician Charles Bioche (1859–1949), are rules to aid in the computation of certain indefinite integrals in which the integrand contains sines and cosines.

In the following, $f(t)$ is a rational expression in $\sin t$ and $\cos t$. In order to calculate $\int f(t)\,dt$, consider the integrand $\omega(t)=f(t)\,dt$. We consider the behavior of this entire integrand, including the $dt$, under translation and reflections of the t axis. The translations and reflections are ones that correspond to the symmetries and periodicities of the basic trigonometric functions.

Bioche's rules state that:

1. If $\omega(-t)=\omega(t)$, a good change of variables is $u=\cos t$.
2. If $\omega(\pi-t)=\omega(t)$, a good change of variables is $u=\sin t$.
3. If $\omega(\pi+t)=\omega(t)$, a good change of variables is $u=\tan t$.
4. If two of the preceding relations both hold, a good change of variables is $u=\cos 2t$.
5. In all other cases, use $u=\tan(t/2)$.

Because rules 1 and 2 involve flipping the t axis, they flip the sign of dt, and therefore the behavior of ω under these transformations differs from that of ƒ by a sign. Although the rules could be stated in terms of ƒ, stating them in terms of ω has a mnemonic advantage, which is that we choose the change of variables u(t) that has the same symmetry as ω.

These rules can be, in fact, stated as a theorem: one shows that the proposed change of variable reduces (if the rule applies and if f is actually of the form $f(t) = \frac{P(\sin t, \cos t)}{Q(\sin t, \cos t)}$) to the integration of a rational function in a new variable, which can be calculated by partial fraction decomposition.

== Case of polynomials ==
To calculate the integral $\int\sin^p(t)\cos^q(t)dt$, Bioche's rules apply as well.

- If p and q are odd, one uses $u = \cos(2t)$;
- If p is odd and q even, one uses $u = \cos(t)$;
- If p is even and q odd, one uses $u = \sin(t)$;
- If not, one is reduced to lineariz.

== Another version for hyperbolic functions ==
Suppose one is calculating $\int g(\cosh t, \sinh t)dt$.

If Bioche's rules suggest calculating $\int g(\cos t, \sin t)dt$ by $u = \cos(t)$ (respectively, $\sin t, \tan t, \cos(2t), \tan(t/2)$), in the case of hyperbolic sine and cosine, a good change of variable is $u = \cosh(t)$ (respectively, $\sinh(t), \tanh(t), \cosh(2t), \tanh(t/2)$). In every case, the change of variable $u = e^t$ allows one to reduce to a rational function, this last change of variable being most interesting in the fourth case ($u = \tanh(t/2)$).

== Examples ==
=== Example 1 ===
As a trivial example, consider
$$\int \sin t \,dt.$$
Then $f(t)=\sin t$ is an odd function, but under a reflection of the t axis about the origin, ω stays the same. That is, ω acts like an even function. This is the same as the symmetry of the cosine, which is an even function, so the mnemonic tells us to use the substitution $u=\cos t$ (rule 1). Under this substitution, the integral becomes $-\int du$. The integrand involving transcendental functions has been reduced to one involving a rational function (a constant). The result is $-u+c=-\cos t+c$, which is of course elementary and could have been done without Bioche's rules.

=== Example 2 ===
The integrand in
$$\int \frac{dt}{\sin t}$$
has the same symmetries as the one in example 1, so we use the same substitution $u=\cos t$. So
$$\frac{dt}{\sin t} = - \frac{du}{\sin^2 t} = - \frac{du}{\ 1-\cos^2 t}.$$

This transforms the integral into
$$\int - \frac{du}{1 - u^2},$$
which can be integrated using partial fractions, since $\frac {1}{1-u^2} = \frac {1}{2} \left( \frac{1}{1+u}+\frac{1}{1-u}\right)$. The result is that
$$\int \frac{dt}{\sin t}=-\frac{1}{2}\ln\frac{1+\cos t}{1-\cos t}+c.$$

=== Example 3 ===
Consider
$$\int \frac{dt}{1+\beta\cos t},$$
where $\beta^2<1$. Although the function f is even, the integrand as a whole ω is odd, so it does not fall under rule 1. It also lacks the symmetries described in rules 2 and 3, so we fall back to the last-resort substitution $u=\tan(t/2)$.

Using $\cos t=\frac{1-\tan^2(t/2)}{1+\tan^2(t/2)}$ and a second substitution $v=\sqrt{\frac{1-\beta}{1+\beta}}u$ leads to the result
$$\int \frac{\mathrm{d}t}{1+\beta\cos t} = \frac{2}{\sqrt{1-\beta^2}}\arctan\left[\sqrt{\frac{1-\beta}{1+\beta}}\tan \frac{t}{2}\right] + c.$$
