= Indian astronomy =

Astronomy on the Indian subcontinent

Astronomy has a long history in the Indian subcontinent, stretching from pre-historic to modern times. Some of the earliest roots of Indian astronomy can be dated to the period of Indus Valley Civilisation or earlier. Astronomy later developed as a discipline of Vedanga, or one of the "auxiliary disciplines" associated with the study of the Vedas dating 1500 BCE or older. The oldest known text is the Vedanga Jyotisha, dated to 1400–1200 BCE (with the extant form possibly from 700 to 600 BCE).

Indian astronomy was influenced by Greek astronomy beginning in the 4th century BCE and through the early centuries of the Common Era, for example by the Yavanajataka and the Romaka Siddhanta, a Sanskrit translation of a Greek text disseminated from the 2nd century.

Indian astronomy flowered in the 5th–6th century, with Aryabhata, whose work, Aryabhatiya, represented the pinnacle of astronomical knowledge at the time. The Aryabhatiya is composed of four sections, covering topics such as units of time, methods for determining the positions of planets, the cause of day and night, and several other cosmological concepts. Later, Indian astronomy significantly influenced Muslim astronomy, Chinese astronomy, European astronomy and others. Other astronomers of the classical era who further elaborated on Aryabhata's work include Brahmagupta, Varahamihira and Lalla.

An identifiable native Indian astronomical tradition remained active throughout the medieval period and into the 16th or 17th century, especially within the Kerala school of astronomy and mathematics.

== History ==
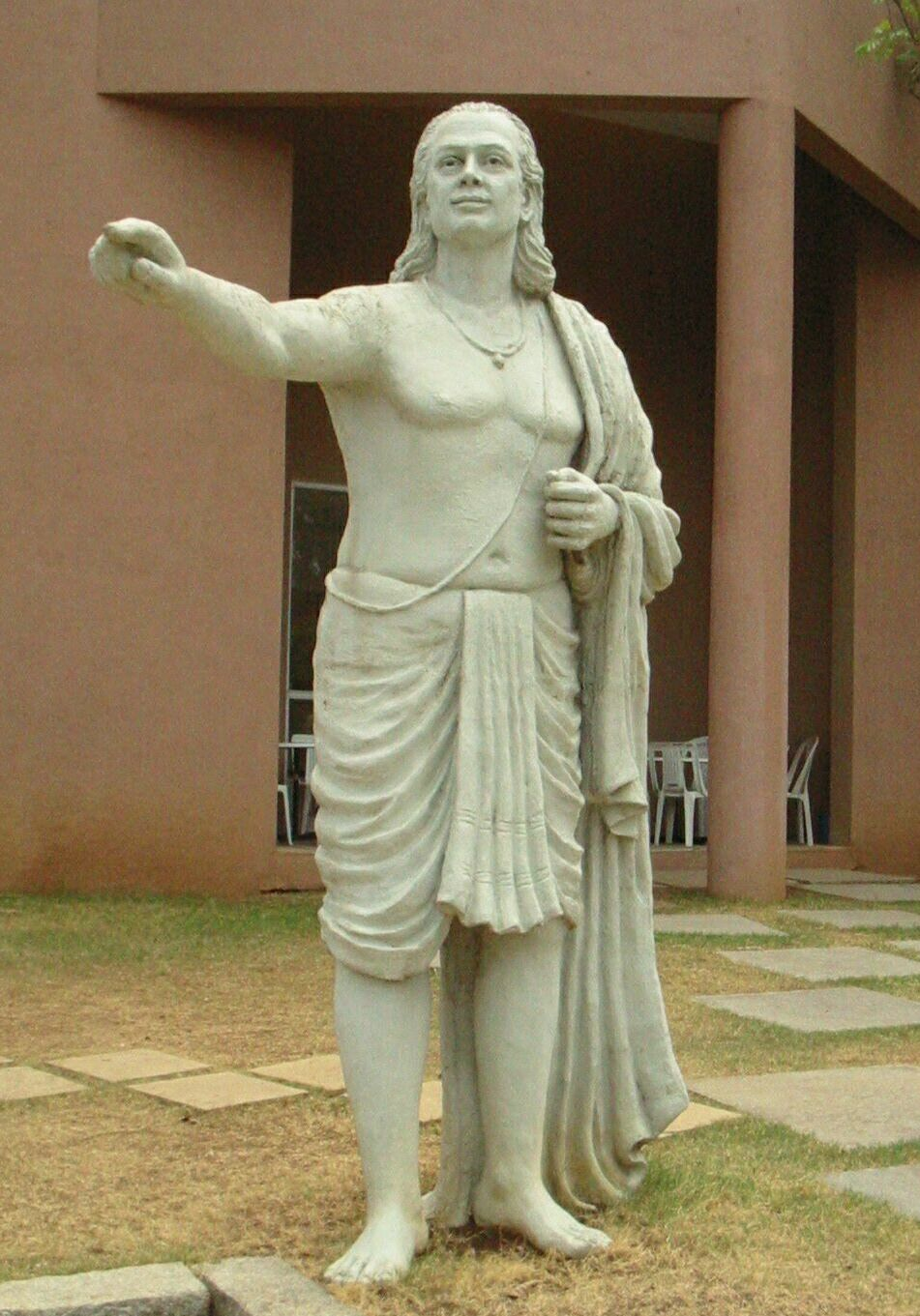
Aryabhata, Indian mathematician and astronomer

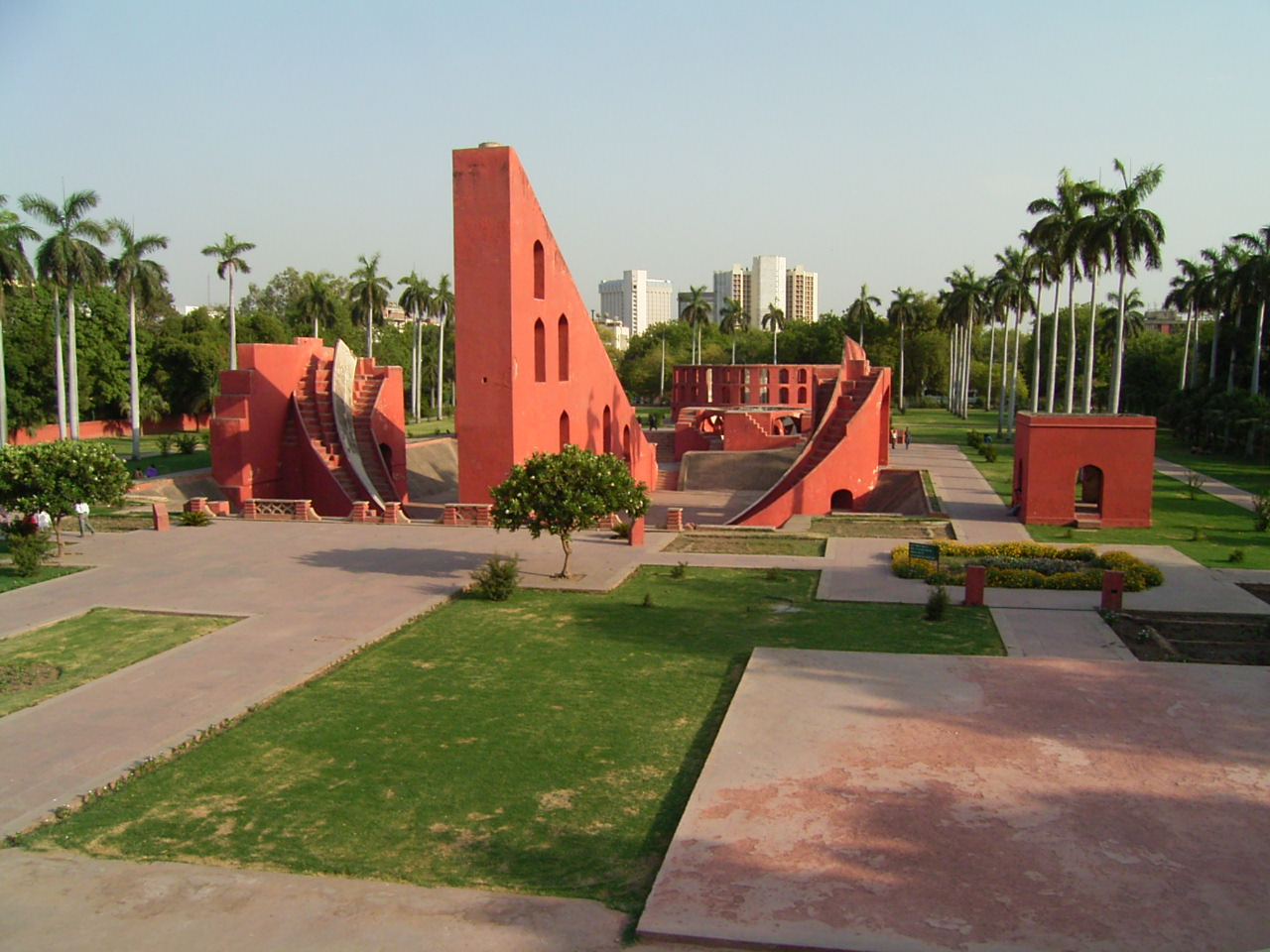
Jantar Mantar, astronomical observatory made by Raja Jai Singh

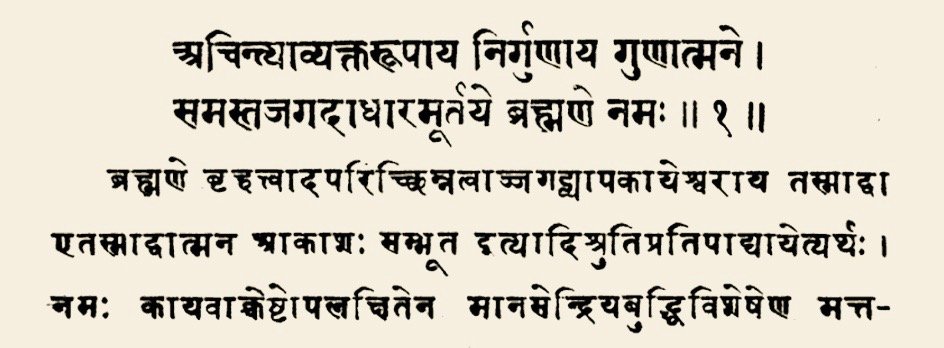
Surya Siddhanta, an astronomical treatise

Some of the earliest forms of astronomy can be dated to the Indus Valley Civilisation or earlier. Some cosmological concepts are present in the Vedas, as are notions of the movement of heavenly bodies and the course of the year. The Rigveda is one of the oldest pieces of Indian literature. Rig Veda 1-64-11 & 48 describes time as a wheel with 12 parts and 360 spokes (days), with a remainder of 5, making reference to the solar calendar. As in other traditions, there is a close association of astronomy and religion during the early history of the science, astronomical observation being necessitated by spatial and temporal requirements of correct performance of religious ritual. Thus, the Shulba Sutras, texts dedicated to altar construction, discusses advanced mathematics and basic astronomy. Vedanga Jyotisha is another of the earliest known Indian texts on astronomy, it includes the details about the Sun, Moon, nakshatras, lunisolar calendar. The Vedanga Jyotisha describes rules for tracking the motions of the Sun and the Moon for the purposes of ritual. According to the Vedanga Jyotisha, in a yuga or "era", there are 5 solar years, 67 lunar sidereal cycles, 1,830 days, 1,835 sidereal days and 62 synodic months.

Greek astronomical ideas began to enter India in the 4th century BCE following the conquests of Alexander the Great. By the early centuries of the Common Era, Indo-Greek influence on the astronomical tradition is visible, with texts such as the Yavanajataka and Romaka Siddhanta. Later astronomers mention the existence of various siddhantas during this period, among them a text known as the Surya Siddhanta. These were not fixed texts but rather an oral tradition of knowledge, and their content is not extant. The text today known as Surya Siddhanta dates to the Gupta period and was received by Aryabhata.

The classical era of Indian astronomy begins in the late Gupta era, in the 5th to 6th centuries. The Pañcasiddhāntikā by Varāhamihira (505 CE) approximates the method for determination of the meridian direction from any three positions of the shadow using a gnomon. By the time of Aryabhata the motion of planets was treated to be elliptical rather than circular. Other topics included definitions of different units of time, eccentric models of planetary motion, epicyclic models of planetary motion, and planetary longitude corrections for various terrestrial locations.

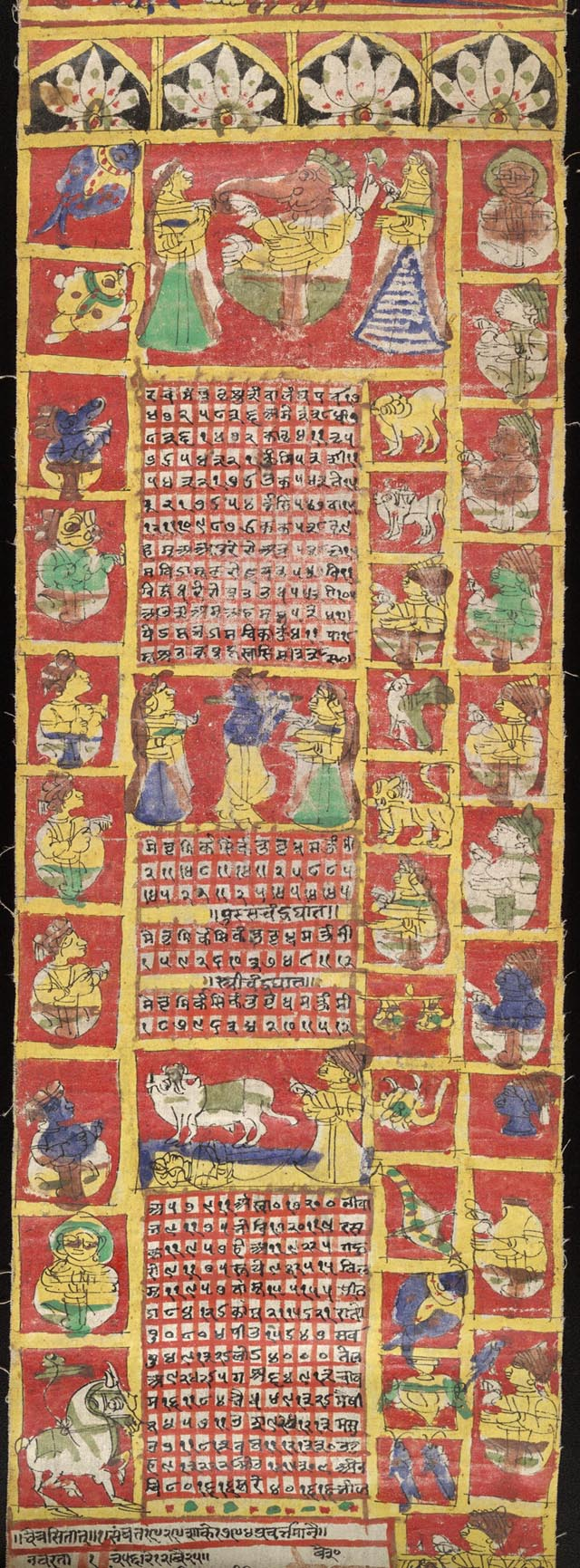
A page from the Hindu calendar 1871–1872.

== Calendars ==
The divisions of the year were on the basis of religious rites and seasons (Ṛtú). The duration from mid March–mid May was taken to be spring (vasanta), mid May–mid July: summer (grishma), mid July–mid September: rains (varsha), mid September–mid November: autumn (sharada), mid November–mid January: winter (hemanta), mid January–mid March: the dews (shishira).

In the Vedānga Jyotiṣa, the year begins with the winter solstice. Hindu calendars have several eras:

- The Hindu calendar, counting from the start of the Kali Yuga, has its epoch on 18 February 3102 BCE Julian (23 January 3102 BCE Gregorian).
- The Vikram Samvat calendar, introduced about the 12th century, counts from 56 to 57 BCE.
- The "Saka Era", used in some Hindu calendars and in the Indian national calendar, has its epoch near the vernal equinox of year 78.
- The Saptarishi calendar traditionally has its epoch at 3076 BCE.

J. A. B. van Buitenen (2008) reports on the calendars in India:

The oldest system, in many respects the basis of the classical one, is known from texts of about 1000 BCE. It divides an approximate solar year of 360 days into 12 lunar months of 27 (according to the early Vedic text Taittirīya Saṃhitā 4.4.10.1–3) or 28 (according to the Atharvaveda, the fourth of the Vedas, 19.7.1.) days. The resulting discrepancy was resolved by the intercalation of a leap month every 60 months. Time was reckoned by the position marked off in constellations on the ecliptic in which the Moon rises daily in the course of one lunation (the period from New Moon to New Moon) and the Sun rises monthly in the course of one year. These constellations (nakṣatra) each measure an arc of 13° 20′ of the ecliptic circle. The positions of the Moon were directly observable, and those of the Sun inferred from the Moon's position at Full Moon, when the Sun is on the opposite side of the Moon. The position of the Sun at midnight was calculated from the nakṣatra that culminated on the meridian at that time, the Sun then being in opposition to that nakṣatra.

== Astronomers ==
- Lagadha (1st millennium BCE): The earliest astronomical text – named Vedānga Jyotiṣa details several astronomical attributes generally applied for timing social and religious events. The Vedānga Jyotiṣa also details astronomical calculations, calendrical studies, and establishes rules for empirical observation. Since the texts written by 1200 BCE were largely religious compositions the Vedānga Jyotiṣa has connections with Indian astrology and details several important aspects of the time and seasons, including lunar months, solar months, and their adjustment by a lunar leap month of Adhimāsa. Ṛtús are also described as yugāṃśas (or parts of the yuga, i.e. conjunction cycle). Tripathi (2008) holds that 'Twenty-seven constellations, eclipses, seven planets, and twelve signs of the zodiac were also known at that time.'
- Āryabhaṭa (476–550 CE): Āryabhaṭa was the author of the Āryabhatīya and the Āryabhaṭasiddhānta, which, according to Hayashi (2008), "circulated mainly in the northwest of India and, through the Sasanian dynasty (224–651) of Iran, had a profound influence on the development of Islamic astronomy. Its contents are preserved to some extent in the works of Varāhamihira (flourished c. 550), Bhāskara I (flourished c. 629), Brahmagupta (598 – c. 665), and others. It is one of the earliest astronomical works to assign the start of each day to midnight." Aryabhata explicitly mentioned that the Earth rotates about its axis, thereby causing what appears to be an apparent westward motion of the stars. In his book, Āryabhatīya, he suggested that the Earth was sphere, containing a circumference of 24,835 miles (39,967 km). Aryabhata also mentioned that reflected sunlight is the cause behind the shining of the Moon. Aryabhata's followers were particularly strong in South India, where his principles of the diurnal rotation of the Earth, among others, were followed and a number of secondary works were based on them.
- Brahmagupta (598–668 CE): Brāhmasphuṭasiddhānta (Correctly Established Doctrine of Brahma, 628 CE) dealt with both Indian mathematics and astronomy. Hayashi (2008) writes: "It was translated into Arabic in Baghdad about 771 and had a major impact on Islamic mathematics and astronomy". In Khandakhadyaka (A Piece Eatable, 665 CE) Brahmagupta reinforced Aryabhata's idea of another day beginning at midnight. Brahmagupta also calculated the instantaneous motion of a planet, gave correct equations for parallax, and some information related to the computation of eclipses. His works introduced the Indian concept of mathematics based astronomy into the Arab world. He also theorized that all bodies with mass are attracted to the Earth.
- Varāhamihira (505 CE): Varāhamihira was an astronomer and mathematician who studied and Indian astronomy as well as the many principles of Greek, Egyptian, and Roman astronomical sciences. His Pañcasiddhāntikā is a treatise and compendium drawing from several knowledge systems.
- Bhāskara I (629 CE): Authored the astronomical works Mahābhāskariya (Great Book of Bhāskara), Laghubhaskariya (Small Book of Bhaskara), and the Aryabhatiyabhashya (629 CE) – a commentary on the Āryabhatīya written by Aryabhata. Hayashi (2008) writes 'Planetary longitudes, heliacal rising and setting of the planets, conjunctions among the planets and stars, solar and lunar eclipses, and the phases of the Moon are among the topics Bhāskara discusses in his astronomical treatises.' Bhāskara I's works were followed by Vateśvara (880 CE), who in his eight chapter Vateśvarasiddhānta devised methods for determining the parallax in longitude directly, the motion of the equinoxes and the solstices, and the quadrant of the Sun at any given time.
- Lalla (8th century CE): Author of the Śiṣyadhīvṛddhida (Treatise Which Expands the Intellect of Students), which corrects several assumptions of Āryabhaṭa. The Śisyadhīvrddhida of Lalla itself is divided into two parts: Grahādhyāya and Golādhyāya. Grahādhyāya (Chapter I-XIII) deals with planetary calculations, determination of the mean and true planets, three problems pertaining to diurnal motion of Earth, eclipses, rising and setting of the planets, the various cusps of the Moon, planetary and astral conjunctions, and complementary situations of the Sun and the Moon. The second part – titled Golādhyāya (chapter XIV–XXII) – deals with graphical representation of planetary motion, astronomical instruments, spherics, and emphasizes on corrections and rejection of flawed principles. Lalla shows influence of Āryabhata, Brahmagupta, and Bhāskara I. His works were followed by later astronomers Śrīpati, Vateśvara, and Bhāskara II. Lalla also authored the Siddhāntatilaka.
- Śatānanda (1068–1099 CE): Authored Bhāsvatī (1099) – estimated precession
- Bhāskara II (1114 CE): Authored Siddhāntaśiromaṇi (Head Jewel of Accuracy) and Karaṇakutūhala (Calculation of Astronomical Wonders) and reported on his observations of planetary positions, conjunctions, eclipses, cosmography, geography, mathematics, and astronomical equipment used in his research at the observatory in Ujjain, which he headed
- Śrīpati (1045 CE): Śrīpati was an astronomer and mathematician who followed the Brahmagupta school and authored the Siddhāntaśekhara (The Crest of Established Doctrines) in 20 chapters, thereby introducing several new concepts, including Moon's second inequality.
- Mahendra Sūri (14th century CE): Mahendra Sūri authored the Yantra-rāja (The King of Instruments, written in 1370 CE) – a Sanskrit work on the astrolabe, itself introduced in India during the reign of the 14th century Tughlaq dynasty ruler Firuz Shah Tughlaq (1351–1388 CE). Sūri seems to have been a Jain astronomer in the service of Firuz Shah Tughluq. The 182 verse Yantra-rāja mentions the astrolabe from the first chapter onwards, and also presents a fundamental formula along with a numerical table for drawing an astrolabe although the proof itself has not been detailed. Longitudes of 32 stars as well as their latitudes have also been mentioned. Mahendra Sūri also explained the Gnomon, equatorial co-ordinates, and elliptical co-ordinates. The works of Mahendra Sūri may have influenced later astronomers like Padmanābha (1423 CE) – author of the Yantra-rāja-adhikāra, the first chapter of his Yantra-kirṇāvali.
- Makarandacarya (1438–1478 CE): Author of the Makaranda sāriṇī
- Parameshvara Nambudiri (1380–1460 CE): Creator of the Drgganita or Drig system, Parameshvara belonged to the Kerala school of astronomy and mathematics. Parameshvara was a proponent of observational astronomy in medieval India and he himself had made a series of eclipse observations to verify the accuracy of the computational methods then in use. Based on his eclipse observations, Parameshvara proposed several corrections to the astronomical parameters which had been in use since the times of Aryabhata.
- Nilakantha Somayaji (1444–1544 CE): In 1500, Nilakantha Somayaji of the Kerala school of astronomy and mathematics, in his Tantrasangraha, revised Aryabhata's model for the planets Mercury and Venus. His equation of the centre for these planets remained the most accurate until the time of Johannes Kepler in the 17th century. Nilakantha Somayaji, in his Āryabhaṭīyabhāṣya, a commentary on Āryabhaṭa's Āryabhaṭīya, developed his own computational system for a partially heliocentric planetary model, in which Mercury, Venus, Mars, Jupiter and Saturn orbit the Sun, which in turn orbits the Earth, similar to the Tychonic system later proposed by Tycho Brahe in the late 16th century. Nilakantha's system, however, was mathematically more efficient than the Tychonic system, due to correctly taking into account the equation of the centre and latitudinal motion of Mercury and Venus. Most astronomers of the Kerala school of astronomy and mathematics who followed him accepted his planetary model. He also authored a treatise titled Jyotirmīmāṁsā stressing the necessity and importance of astronomical observations to obtain correct parameters for computations.
- Daśabala (fl. 1055–1058 CE): Author of Cintāmanṇisāraṇikā (1055) and the Karaṇakamalamārtaṇḍa (1058).
- Acyuta Piṣāraṭi (1550–1621 CE): Sphuṭanirṇaya (Determination of True Planets) details an elliptical correction to existing notions. Sphuṭanirṇaya was later expanded to Rāśigolasphutānīti (True Longitude Computation of the Sphere of the Zodiac). Another work, Karanottama deals with eclipses, complementary relationship between the Sun and the Moon, and 'the derivation of the mean and true planets'. In Uparāgakriyākrama (Method of Computing Eclipses), Acyuta Piṣāraṭi suggests improvements in methods of calculation of eclipses.
- Dinakara (1550 CE): Author of a popular work, the Candrārkī with 33 verses to produce calendars, calculate lunar, solar, and star positions.
- Hemangada Thakura (1530AD-1590AD): Astronomer from Mithila, he was the author of the Sanskrit astronomical treatise Grahan Mala detailing dates of the eclipses from 1620 AD to 2708 AD. The print version of the text was later published by the Kameshwar Singh Darbhanga Sanskrit University.
- Mathurānātha Śarman (1609 CE): Author of Ravisiddhāntamañjarī or Sūryasiddhāntamañjarī
- Pathani Samanta (1835–1904 ) the last in chain of naked eye astronomers of India belonging to Siddhantic Era. Was born in Kahndapada, a feudatory state of Odisha. He studied various Siddhantas and found them to be erroneous as the planets were either not found at the right places or at right time. He made more studies, observed deeply and made several instruments to perfect his analysis of his observation. He composed his findings into a voluminous treatise name Siddhanta Darpan giving new formulaes to predict celestial occurrences. His almanac was adopted by the Jagannath Temple of Puri. He was awarded the title of Mahamahopadhyaya by the Viceroy of India Mr.Lansdowne and also a title Harichandan Mahapatra by Gajapati King of Puri. The instruments designed by him were for measurement of time and position of stellar bodies and were named Chapa Yantra, Mana Yantra, Golardha Yantra, Dhanu Yantra, Chakra Yantra, Swayambha Yantra, Gola Yantra etc. A postage stamp has been issued by the government of India in his honor.

== Instruments used ==
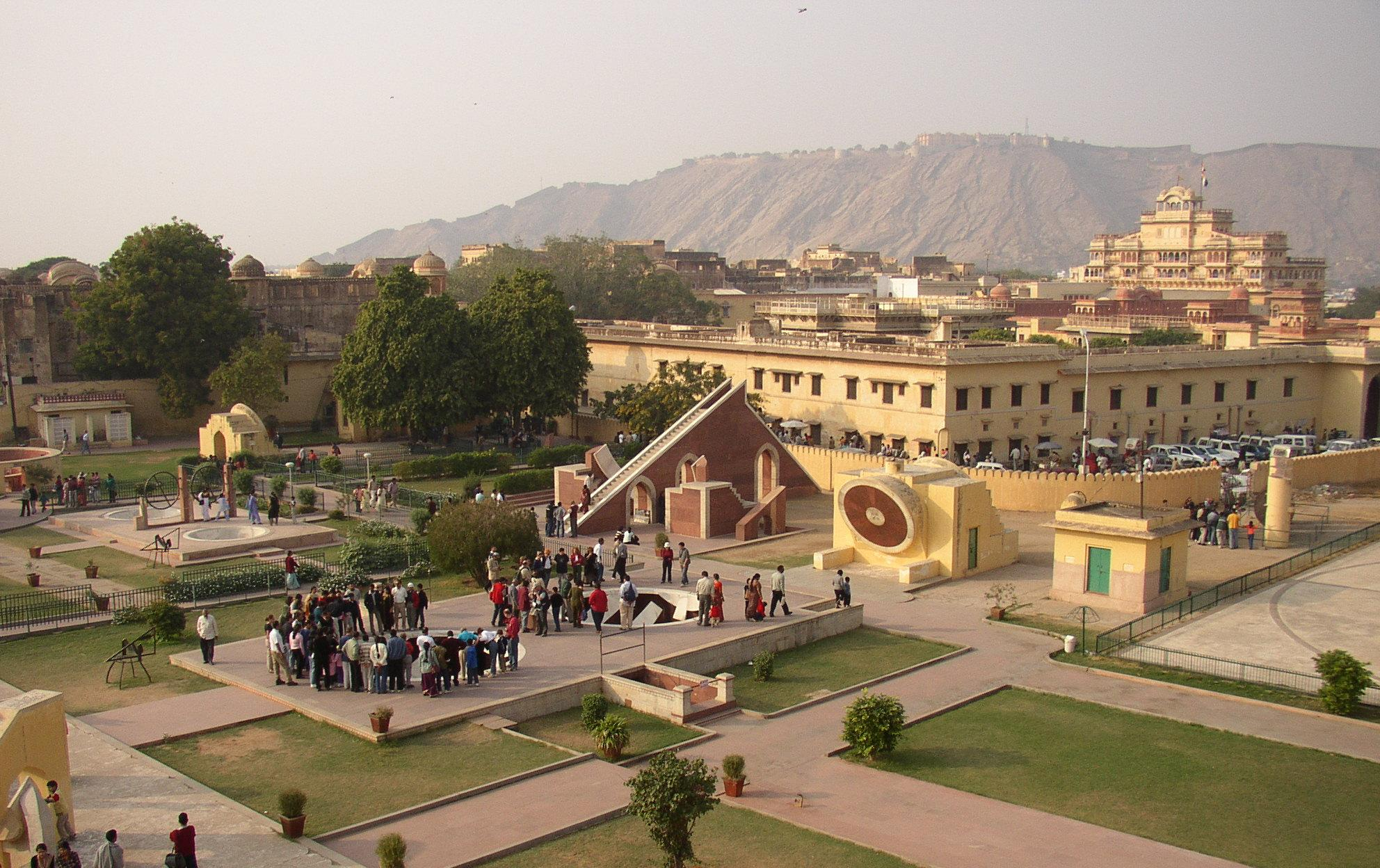
Sawai Jai Singh (1688–1743 CE) initiated the construction of several observatories. Shown here is the Jantar Mantar (Jaipur) observatory.

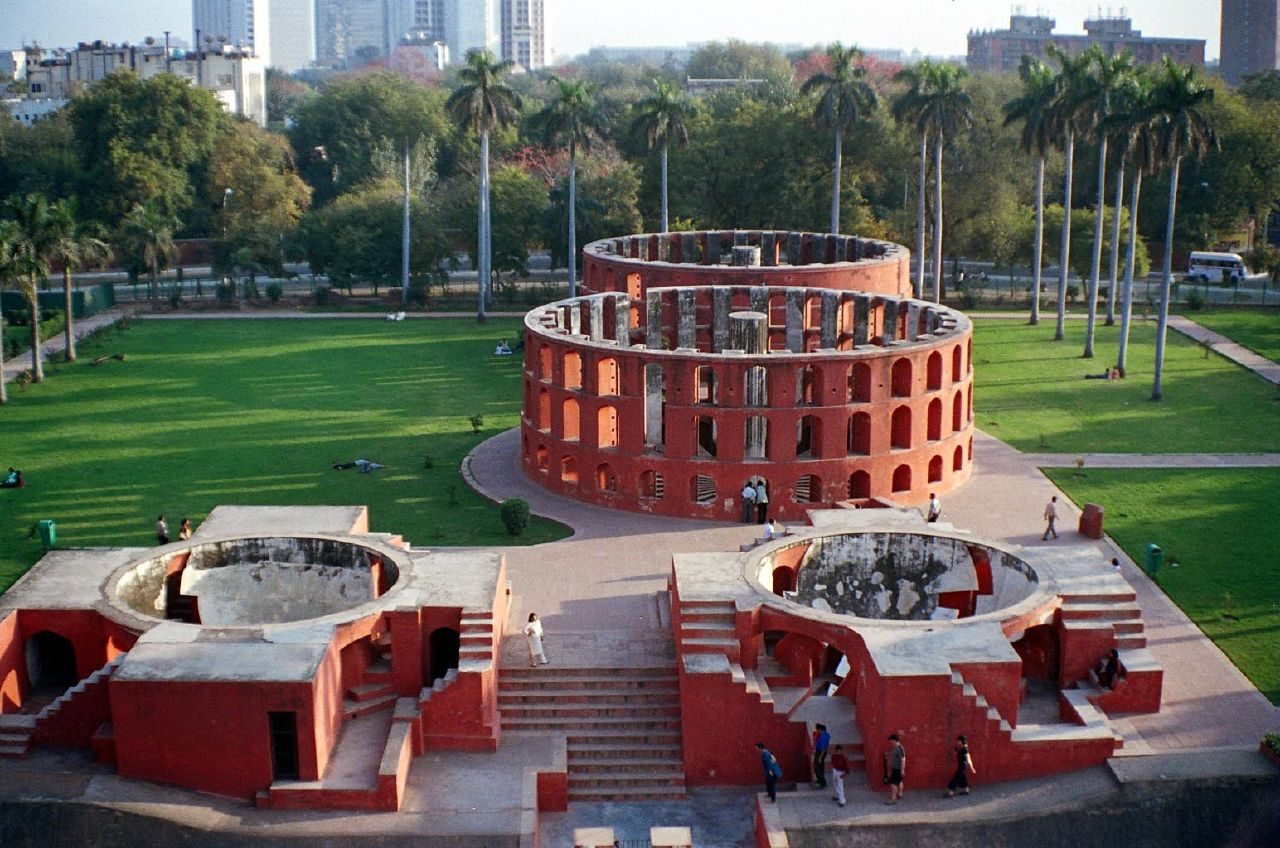
Yantra Mandir (completed by 1743 CE), Delhi.

Astronomical instrument with graduated scale and notation in Hindu-Arabic numerals.

Among the devices used for astronomy was gnomon, known as Sanku, in which the shadow of a vertical rod is applied on a horizontal plane in order to ascertain the cardinal directions, the latitude of the point of observation, and the time of observation. This device finds mention in the works of Varāhamihira, Āryabhata, Bhāskara, Brahmagupta, among others. The Cross-staff, known as Yasti-yantra, was used by the time of Bhaskara II (1114–1185 CE). This device could vary from a simple stick to V-shaped staffs designed specifically for determining angles with the help of a calibrated scale. The clepsydra (Ghatī-yantra) was used in India for astronomical purposes until recent times. Ōhashi (2008) notes that: "Several astronomers also described water-driven instruments such as the model of fighting sheep."

The armillary sphere was used for observation in India since early times, and finds mention in the works of Āryabhata (476 CE). The Goladīpikā – a detailed treatise dealing with globes and the armillary sphere was composed between 1380 and 1460 CE by Parameśvara. On the subject of the usage of the armillary sphere in India, Ōhashi (2008) writes: "The Indian armillary sphere (gola-yantra) was based on equatorial coordinates, unlike the Greek armillary sphere, which was based on ecliptical coordinates, although the Indian armillary sphere also had an ecliptical hoop. Probably, the celestial coordinates of the junction stars of the lunar mansions were determined by the armillary sphere since the seventh century or so. There was also a celestial globe rotated by flowing water."

An instrument invented by the mathematician and astronomer Bhaskara II (1114–1185 CE) consisted of a rectangular board with a pin and an index arm. This device – called the Phalaka-yantra – was used to determine time from the Sun's altitude. The Kapālayantra was an equatorial sundial instrument used to determine the Sun's azimuth. Kartarī-yantra combined two semicircular board instruments to give rise to a 'scissors instrument'. Introduced from the Islamic world and first finding mention in the works of Mahendra Suri – the court astronomer of Firuz Shah Tughluq (1309–1388 CE) – the astrolabe was further mentioned by Padmanābha (1423 CE) and Rāmacandra (1428 CE) as its use grew in India.

Invented by Padmanābha, a nocturnal polar rotation instrument consisted of a rectangular board with a slit and a set of pointers with concentric graduated circles. Time and other astronomical quantities could be calculated by adjusting the slit to the directions of α and β Ursa Minor. Ōhashi (2008) further explains that: "Its backside was made as a quadrant with a plumb and an index arm. Thirty parallel lines were drawn inside the quadrant, and trigonometrical calculations were done graphically. After determining the sun's altitude with the help of the plumb, time was calculated graphically with the help of the index arm."

Ōhashi (2008) reports on the observatories constructed by Jai Singh II of Amber:

The Mahārāja of Jaipur, Sawai Jai Singh (1688–1743 CE), constructed five astronomical observatories at the beginning of the eighteenth century. The observatory in Mathura is not extant, but those in Delhi, Jaipur, Ujjain, and Banaras are. There are several huge instruments based on Hindu and Islamic astronomy. For example, the samrāt.-yantra (emperor instrument) is a huge sundial which consists of a triangular gnomon wall and a pair of quadrants toward the east and west of the gnomon wall. Time has been graduated on the quadrants.

The seamless celestial globe invented in Mughal India, specifically Lahore and Kashmir, is considered to be one of the most impressive astronomical instruments and remarkable feats in metallurgy and engineering. All globes before and after this were seamed, and in the 20th century, it was believed by metallurgists to be technically impossible to create a metal globe without any seams, even with modern technology. It was in the 1980s, however, that Emilie Savage-Smith discovered several celestial globes without any seams in Lahore and Kashmir. The earliest was invented in Kashmir by Ali Kashmiri ibn Luqman in 1589–90 CE during Akbar the Great's reign; another was produced in 1659–60 CE by Muhammad Salih Tahtawi with Arabic and Sanskrit inscriptions; and the last was produced in Lahore by a Hindu metallurgist Lala Balhumal Lahuri in 1842 during Jagatjit Singh Bahadur's reign. 21 such globes were produced, and these remain the only examples of seamless metal globes. These Mughal metallurgists developed the method of lost-wax casting in order to produce these globes.

== International discourse ==
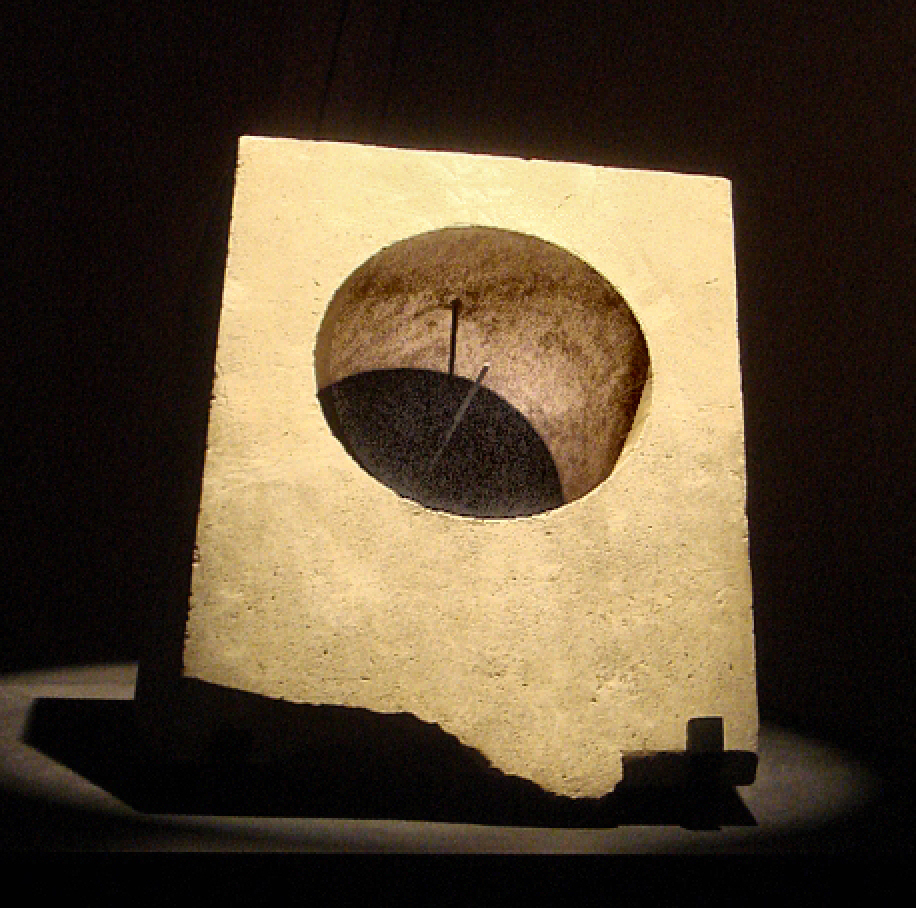
Greek equatorial sun dial, Ai-Khanoum, Afghanistan 3rd–2nd centuries BCE

=== Indian and Greek astronomy ===
According to David Pingree, there are a number of Indian astronomical texts dated to the sixth century CE or later with a high degree of certainty. There is substantial similarity between these and pre-Ptolemaic Greek astronomy. Pingree believes that these similarities suggest a Greek origin for certain aspects of Indian astronomy. One of the direct proofs for this approach is the fact quoted that many Sanskrit words related to astronomy, astrology and calendar are either direct phonetic borrowings from the Greek language, or translations, assuming complex ideas, like the names of the days of the week which presuppose a relation between those days, planets (including Sun and Moon) and gods.

With the rise of Greek culture in the east, Hellenistic astronomy filtered eastwards to India, where it profoundly influenced the local astronomical tradition. For example, Hellenistic astronomy is known to have been practised near India in the Greco-Bactrian city of Ai-Khanoum from the 3rd century BCE. Various sun-dials, including an equatorial sundial adjusted to the latitude of Ujjain have been found in archaeological excavations there. Numerous interactions with the Mauryan Empire, and the later expansion of the Indo-Greeks into India suggest that transmission of Greek astronomical ideas to India occurred during this period. The Greek concept of a spherical Earth surrounded by the spheres of planets, further influenced the astronomers like Varahamihira and Brahmagupta.

Several Greco-Roman astrological treatises are also known to have been exported to India during the first few centuries of the present era. The Yavanajataka is a Sanskrit text of the 3rd century CE on Greek horoscopy and mathematical astronomy. Rudradaman's capital at Ujjain "became the Greenwich of Indian astronomers and the Arin of the Arabic and Latin astronomical treatises; for it was he and his successors who encouraged the introduction of Greek horoscopy and astronomy into India."

Later in the 6th century, the Romaka Siddhanta ("Doctrine of the Romans"), and the Paulisa Siddhanta ("Doctrine of Paul") were considered as two of the five main astrological treatises, which were compiled by Varāhamihira in his Pañca-siddhāntikā ("Five Treatises"), a compendium of Greek, Egyptian, Roman and Indian astronomy. Varāhamihira goes on to state that "The Greeks, indeed, are foreigners, but with them this science (astronomy) is in a flourishing state." Another Indian text, the Gargi-Samhita, also similarly compliments the Yavanas (Greeks) noting they, though barbarians, must be respected as seers for their introduction of astronomy in India.

=== Indian and Chinese astronomy ===
Indian astronomy reached China with the expansion of Buddhism during the Later Han period (25–220 CE). Further translation of Indian works on astronomy was completed in China by the Three Kingdoms era (220–265 CE). However, the most detailed incorporation of Indian astronomy occurred only during the Tang dynasty (618–907 CE) when a number of Chinese scholars – such as Yi Xing – were versed both in Indian and Chinese astronomy. A system of Indian astronomy was recorded in China as Jiuzhi-li (718 CE), the author of which was an Indian by the name of Qutan Xida – a translation of Devanagari Gotama Siddha – the director of the Tang dynasty's national astronomical observatory.

Fragments of texts during this period indicate that Arabs adopted the sine function (inherited from Indian mathematics) instead of the chords of arc used in Hellenistic mathematics. Another Indian influence was an approximate formula used for timekeeping by Muslim astronomers. Through Islamic astronomy, Indian astronomy had an influence on European astronomy via Arabic translations. During the Latin translations of the 12th century, Muhammad al-Fazari's Great Sindhind (based on the Surya Siddhanta and the works of Brahmagupta), was translated into Latin in 1126 and was influential at the time.

=== Indian and Islamic astronomy ===
Many Indian works on astronomy and astrology were translated into Middle Persian in Gundeshapur, the Sasanian Empire, and later translated from Middle Persian into Arabic.

In the 17th century, the Mughal Empire saw a synthesis between Islamic and Hindu astronomy, where Islamic observational instruments were combined with Hindu computational techniques. While there appears to have been little concern for planetary theory, Muslim and Hindu astronomers in India continued to make advances in observational astronomy and produced nearly a hundred Zij treatises. Humayun built a personal observatory near Delhi, while Jahangir and Shah Jahan were also intending to build observatories but were unable to do so. After the decline of the Mughal Empire, it was a Hindu king, Jai Singh II of Amber, who attempted to revive both the Islamic and Hindu traditions of astronomy which were stagnant in his time. In the early 18th century, he built several large observatories called Yantra Mandirs, to rival Ulugh Beg's Samarkand observatory and to improve on the earlier Hindu computations in the Siddhantas and Islamic observations in Zij-i-Sultani. The instruments he used were influenced by Islamic astronomy, while the computational techniques were derived from Hindu astronomy.

=== Indian astronomy and Europe ===
Some scholars have suggested that knowledge of the results of the Kerala school of astronomy and mathematics may have been transmitted to Europe through the trade route from Kerala by traders and Jesuit missionaries. Kerala was in continuous contact with China, Arabia and Europe. The existence of circumstantial evidence such as communication routes and a suitable chronology certainly make such a transmission a possibility. However, there is no direct evidence by way of relevant manuscripts that such a transmission took place.

In the early 18th century, Jai Singh II of Amber invited European Jesuit astronomers to one of his Yantra Mandir observatories, who had bought back the astronomical tables compiled by Philippe de La Hire in 1702. After examining La Hire's work, Jai Singh concluded that the observational techniques and instruments used in European astronomy were inferior to those used in India at the time – it is uncertain whether he was aware of the Copernican Revolution via the Jesuits. He did, however, employ the use of telescopes. In his Zij-i Muhammad Shahi, he states: "telescopes were constructed in my kingdom and using them a number of observations were carried out".

Following the arrival of the British East India Company in the 18th century, the Hindu and Islamic traditions were slowly displaced by European astronomy, though there were attempts at harmonising these traditions. The Indian scholar Mir Muhammad Hussain had travelled to England in 1774 to study Western science and, on his return to India in 1777, he wrote a Persian treatise on astronomy. He wrote about the heliocentric model, and argued that there exists an infinite number of universes (awalim), each with their own planets and stars, and that this demonstrates the omnipotence of God, who is not confined to a single universe. The last known Zij treatise was the Zij-i Bahadurkhani, written in 1838 by the Indian astronomer Ghulam Hussain Jaunpuri (1760–1862) and printed in 1855, dedicated to Bahadur Khan. The treatise incorporated the heliocentric system into the Zij tradition.

== Schools and organisations of astronomy ==
=== Jantar Mantar ===
Jantar (means yantra, machine); mantar (means calculate). Jai Singh II in the 18th century took great interest in science and astronomy. He made various Jantar Mantars in Jaipur, Delhi, Ujjain, Varanasi and Mathura. The Jaipur instance has 19 different astronomical calculators. These comprise live and forward-calculating astronomical clocks (calculators) for days, eclipses, visibility of key constellations which are not year-round northern polar ones thus principally but not exclusively those of the zodiac. Astronomers abroad were invited and admired complexity of certain devices.

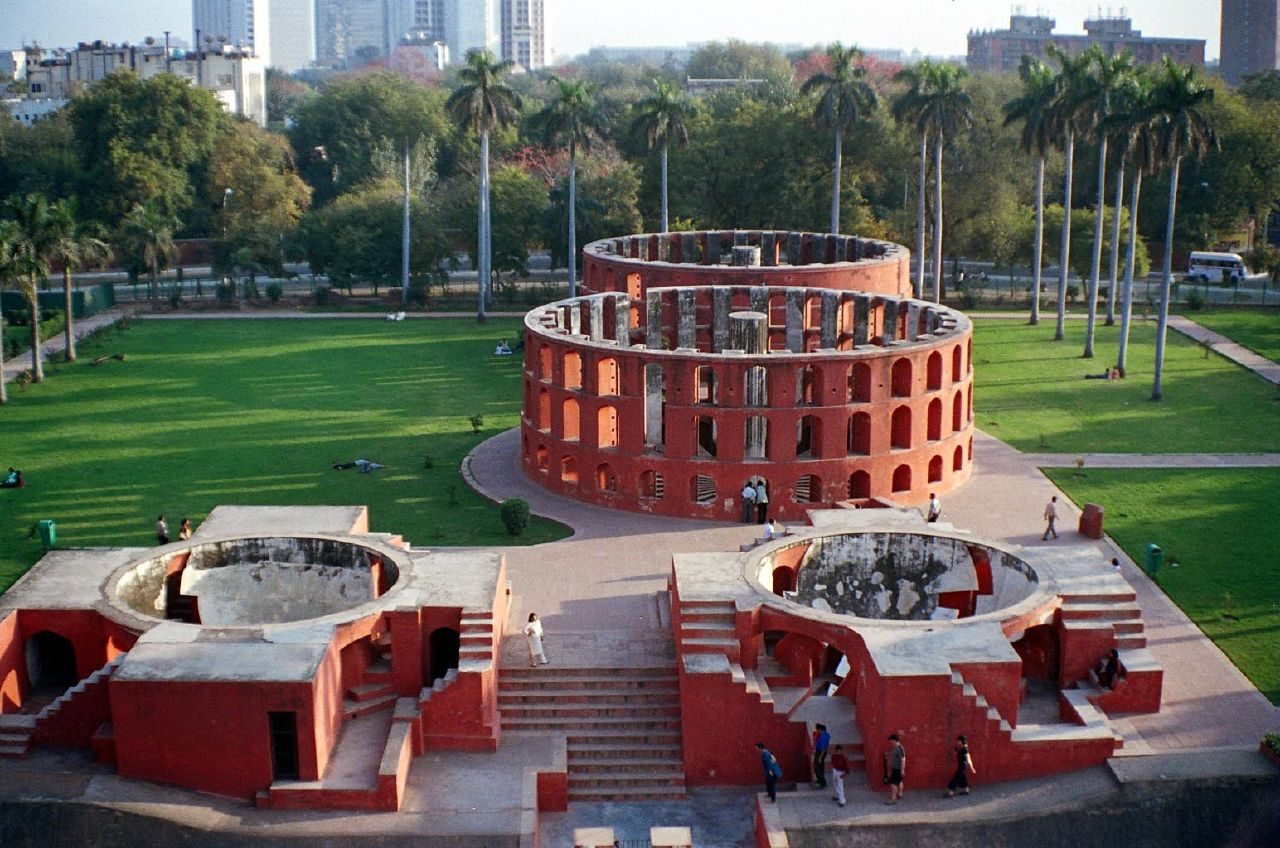
Yantra Mandir (completed by 1743 CE), Delhi.

Samrat yantra with divisions of hours, minutes and seconds

As brass time-calculators are imperfect, and to help in their precise re-setting so as to match true locally experienced time, there remains equally his Samrat Yantra, the largest sundial in the world. It divides each daylit hour as to solar 15-minute, 1-minute and 6-second subunits. Other notable include:

- Nadivalaya yantra
- Rama Yantra
- Daksinottara Bhitti
- Unnatamsha Yantra
- Jai Prakash yantra

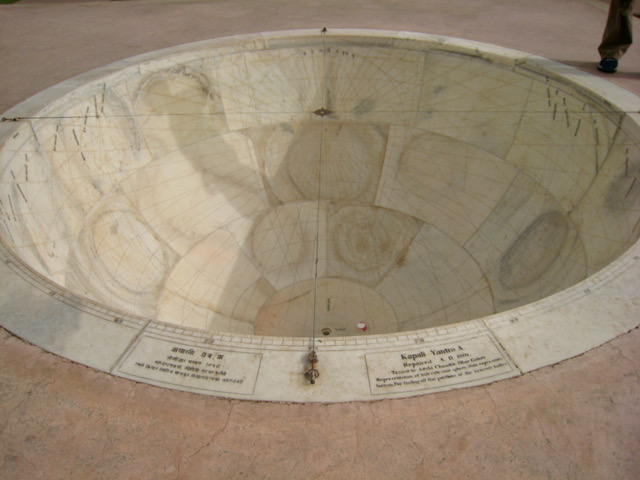
Kapali Yantra at Jantar Mantar, Jaipur

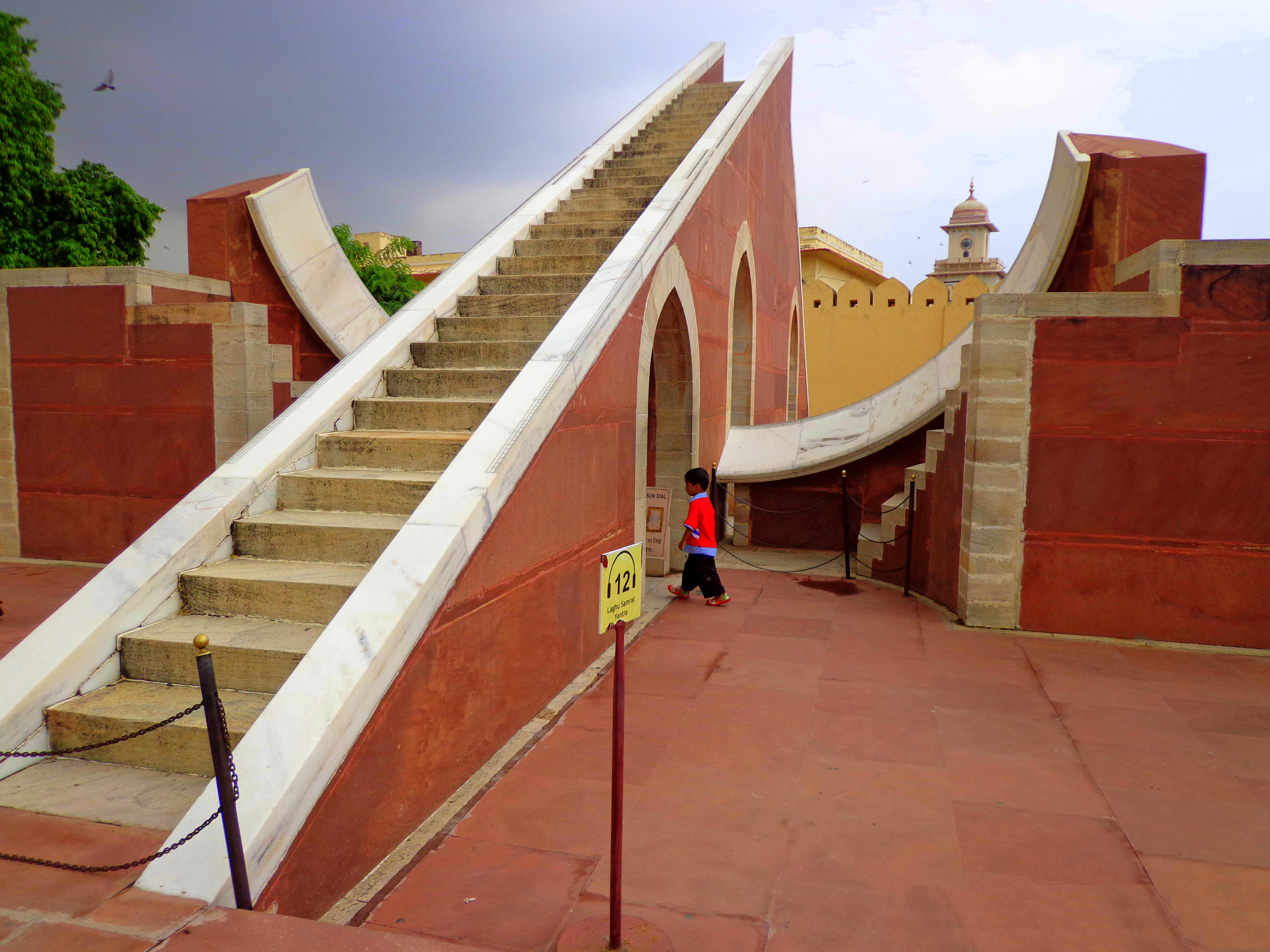
Laghu samrat yantra

=== Kerala school of astronomy and mathematics ===
Models of the Kerala school (active 1380 to 1632) involved higher order polynomials and other cutting-edge algebra; many neatly were put to use, principally for predicting motions and alignments within the Solar System.

== 20th and 21st Century ==
=== Astronomers ===
During 1920, astronomers like Sisir Kumar Mitra, C.V. Raman and Meghnad Saha worked on various projects such as sounding of the ionosphere through ground-based radio and the Saha ionisation equation. Homi J. Bhaba and Vikram Sarabhai made significant contributions. Vainu Bappu considered father of modern Indian astronomy and Govind Swarup considered father of radio astronomy in India initiated development of modern astronomical observatories that placed India astronomy in the world map. A. P. J. Abdul Kalam also known as Missile Man of India assisted in development and research for the Defence Research and Development Organisation and the Indian Space Research Organisation's (ISRO) civilian space programme and launch vehicle technology.

=== Organizations ===
Madras Observatory, established in 1786, was the first observatory on Indian soil equipped with modern telescopes, photographic plates and spectrographs. It played a significant role in the discovery of Helium, in the solar spectrum, during the solar eclipse. In 1899 it was relocated and evolved to form the Kodaikanal Solar Observatory. In 1971, it evolved again to form the Indian Institute of Astrophysics in Bangalore becoming a large organisation dedicated to research in astronomy and astrophysics. Nizamiah/Osmania Observatory (Estd. 1900 ) and Uttar Pradesh State Observatory (Estd. 1951), which later moved from Lucknow to Nainital and became Aryabhatta Research Institute for Observational Sciences (ARIES) were two other early astronomical organisations to initiate modern astronomical research in India.

Bhaba established the Tata Institute of Fundamental Research and Vikram Sarabhai established the Physical Research Laboratory. These organisations researched cosmic radiation and conducted studies of the upper atmosphere. In 1950, the Department of Atomic Energy was founded with Bhaba as secretary and provided funding to space researches in the country. The Indian National Committee for Space Research (INCOSPAR) was founded in 1962 on the urging of Sarabhai. ISRO succeeded INCOSPAR and the Department of Space (under Indira Gandhi) was established, thereby institutionalising astronomical research in India. Organisations like SPARRSO in Bangladesh, SUPARCO in Pakistan and others were founded shortly after.

Ooty Radio Telescope, constructed in 1970, gave rise to radio astronomy observatories in India. It is still the largest, fully steerable, cylindrical radio telescope in the world. The team grew big and by the year 2000 built the Giant Meterwave radio Telescope, the largest such radio telescope in the world. The power and versatility of GMRT attracts astronomers from all over the world, to use it free of cost, and contribute towards the advancement of human knowledge about space and Universe.

=== Space programmes and research ===
- ISRO played a role in the discovery of three species of extremophile bacteria in the upper stratosphere at an altitude between 20–40 km which are highly resistant to ultra-violet radiation, which are named as Bacillus isronensis, Bacillus aryabhattai (in recognition of ISRO's contribution) and Janibacter hoylei.
- Astrosat, a space observatory launched in 2015 by ISRO, detected a gamma-ray burst in January 2017, captured a rare phenomenon of a 6-billion-year-old blue straggler feeding off and sucking out mass and energy out of a bigger star and detected a rare X-ray outburst in a Be/X-ray binary system RX J0209.6-7427.
- Chandrayaan-3 is the third mission in the Chandrayaan programme, a series of lunar-exploration missions developed by the ISRO. It objectivized to conduct soft landing on Lunar south pole, observing & demonstrating the rover's driving capabilities on the Moon and conducting experiments on the materials available on the lunar surface to better understand the composition of the Moon. The launch was done on 14 July 2023 at the Satish Dhawan Space Centre. The lander and rover successfully landed at the south pole of moon on 23 August 2023.

== See also ==
- Astronomical basis of the Hindu calendar
- Astronomy in the medieval Islamic world
- Buddhist cosmology
- Chinese astronomy
- Hindu calendar
- Hindu astrology
- Hindu chronology
- Hindu cosmology
- History of astronomy
- Jain cosmology
- Lahore family of astrolabists
- List of numbers in Hindu scriptures
- Nirayana system

== Bibliography ==
- Abraham, G. (2008), "Gnomon in India", Encyclopaedia of the History of Science, Technology, and Medicine in Non-Western Cultures (2nd edition) edited by Helaine Selin, pp. 1035–1037, Springer, ISBN 978-1-4020-4559-2.
- Almeida, D. F.; et al. (2001). "Keralese Mathematics: Its Possible Transmission to Europe and the Consequential Educational Implications". Journal of Natural Geometry. 20: 77–104.
- Baber, Zaheer (1996), The Science of Empire: Scientific Knowledge, Civilization, and Colonial Rule in India, State University of New York Press, ISBN 0-7914-2919-9.
- Dallal, Ahmad (1999), "Science, Medicine and Technology", The Oxford History of Islam edited by John Esposito, Oxford University Press.
- Hayashi, Takao (2008), Aryabhata I, Encyclopædia Britannica.
- Hayashi, Takao (2008), Bhaskara I, Encyclopædia Britannica.
- Hayashi, Takao (2008), Brahmagupta, Encyclopædia Britannica.
- Hayashi, Takao (2008), Shripati, Encyclopædia Britannica.
- J.A.B. van Buitenen (2008), calendar, Encyclopædia Britannica.
- Joseph, George G. (2000), The Crest of the Peacock: Non-European Roots of Mathematics, Penguin Books, ISBN 0-691-00659-8.
- King, David A (2002). "A Vetustissimus Arabic Text on the Quadrans Vetus". Journal for the History of Astronomy. 33 (3): 237–255. Bibcode:2002JHA....33..237K. doi:10.1177/002182860203300302. S2CID 125329755.
- Klostermaier, Klaus K. (2003), "Hinduism, History of Science and Religion", Encyclopedia of Science and Religion edited by J. Wentzel Vrede van Huyssteen, pp. 405–410, Macmillan Reference USA, ISBN 0-02-865704-7.
- Raju, C. K. (2001). "Computers, Mathematics Education, and the Alternative Epistemology of the Calculus in the Yuktibhasa". Philosophy East and West. 51 (3): 325–362. doi:10.1353/pew.2001.0045. S2CID 170341845.
- Ramasubramanian (1994). "Modification of the earlier Indian planetary theory by the Kerala astronomers (c. 1500 CE) and the implied heliocentric picture of planetary motion". Current Science. 66: 784–790.
- Sarma, K. V. (2008a). "Astronomy in India". In Helaine Selin (ed.). Encyclopaedia of the History of Science, Technology, and Medicine in Non-Western Cultures (2nd ed.). Springer. pp. 317–321. doi:10.1007/978-1-4020-4425-0_9554. ISBN 978-1-4020-4559-2.
- Sarma, K. V. (2008b). "Lalla". In Helaine Selin (ed.). Encyclopaedia of the History of Science, Technology, and Medicine in Non-Western Cultures (2nd ed.). Springer. p. 1215. doi:10.1007/978-1-4020-4425-0_9577. ISBN 978-1-4020-4559-2.
- Sarma, K. V. (2008c). "Acyuta Piṣāraṭi". In Helaine Selin (ed.). Encyclopaedia of the History of Science, Technology, and Medicine in Non-Western Cultures (2nd ed.). Springer. p. 19. doi:10.1007/978-1-4020-4425-0_9546. ISBN 978-1-4020-4559-2.
- Sarma, K. V. (2008d). "Armillary Spheres in India". In Helaine Selin (ed.). Encyclopaedia of the History of Science, Technology, and Medicine in Non-Western Cultures (2nd ed.). Springer. p. 243. doi:10.1007/978-1-4020-4425-0_9552. ISBN 978-1-4020-4559-2.
- Sarma, Nataraja (2000). "Diffusion of Astronomy in the Ancient World". Endeavour. 24 (4): 157–164. doi:10.1016/s0160-9327(00)01327-2. PMID 11196987.
- Sharma, V. N. (1995), Sawai Jai Singh and His Astronomy, Motilal Banarsidass, ISBN 81-208-1256-5.
- Sharma, V. N. (2008), "Observatories in India", Encyclopaedia of the History of Science, Technology, and Medicine in Non-Western Cultures (2nd edition) edited by Helaine Selin, pp. 1785–1788, Springer, ISBN 978-1-4020-4559-2.
- Savage-Smith, Emilie (1985), Islamicate Celestial Globes: Their History, Construction, and Use, Smithsonian Institution Press.
- Subbaarayappa, B. V. (1989), "Indian astronomy: an historical perspective", Cosmic Perspectives edited by Biswas etc., pp. 25–41. Cambridge University Press. ISBN 0-521-34354-2.
- Tripathi, V. N. (2008), "Astrology in India", Encyclopaedia of the History of Science, Technology, and Medicine in Non-Western Cultures (2nd ed.) edited by Helaine Selin, pp. 264–267, Springer, ISBN 978-1-4020-4559-2.
- Daniel, R. R. (1992). "Space Science in India". Indian Journal of History of Science. 27 (4). New Delhi: Indian National Science Academy: 485–499.
- Sadeh, Eligar (2013). Space Strategy in the 21st Century: Theory and Policy. Routledge. ISBN 978-1-136-22623-6. Archived from the original on 6 March 2016.
- Bhargava, Pushpa M.; Chakrabarti, Chandana (2003). The Saga of Indian Science Since Independence: In a Nutshell. Universities Press. pp. 39–. ISBN 978-81-7371-435-1. Archived from the original on 13 May 2016.
