= Siddhanta =

Term from Indian philosophy

Siddhānta (Devanagari: सिद्धान्त lit. 'established end') is a Sanskrit term denoting the established and accepted view of any particular school within Indian philosophy; literally "settled opinion or doctrine, dogma, axiom, received or admitted truth; any fixed or established or canonical text-book on any subject" (from siddha, adj. mfn.- accomplished, fulfilled; that has attained the highest object, thoroughly skilled or versed in).

== Hindu philosophy ==
This term is an established term within Hindu philosophy which denotes a specific line of development within a Hindu religious or philosophical tradition. The traditional schools of Hindu philosophy have had their siddhāntas established by their respective founders in the form of sūtras (aphorisms). The sūtras are commented by a major philosopher in the respective traditions to elaborate upon the established doctrine by quoting from the śāstras (scriptures) and using logic and pramāṇas (accepted source of knowledge). For example, in the tradition of Vedanta, the author of the Brahma Sūtra was Veda-Vyāsa and the commentators were Ādi Śaṅkara, Rāmānuja and Mādhavācārya (each of whom eventually set up sub-schools within Vedānta). Also, in the tradition of Pūrva Mīmāṁsā, the author of the sūtra was Jaimini and the commentator was Śabarasvāmi.

== Buddhist philosophy ==
Siddhānta (Tibetan: grub mtha') is a genre of Buddhist literature, which is quite common in Tibetan Buddhism. This genre has its antecedents in Pali suttas such as the Tevijja sutta and the Brahmajala sutta. These early Buddhist sources discuss the various worldviews of brahmins, sramanas and ascetics during the Buddha's time. Buddhist scholastic literature later expanded the discussion to numerous other Buddhist and non-Buddhist views. Indian works which discuss various competing doctrines include the Kathavatthu, the Mahavibhasa, Bhaviveka's Blaze of Reasoning and Shantaraksita's Tattvasamgraha.

Tibetan Buddhists developed the genre further and numerous siddhānta works were written by figures such as Rongzompa, Chekawa Yeshe Dorje, Sakya Pandita, Longchenpa, Jamyang Shéba, and Changkya Rölpé Dorjé. According to Daniel Cozort, Jamyang's massive Great Exposition of Tenets "are the most comprehensive of the tenets texts" (in Tibetan Buddhism). During the 18th century, Thuken Losang Chökyi Nyima (1737–1802), a student of Changkya, wrote Crystal Mirror of Philosophical Systems. According to Roger R. Jackson, this text is "arguably the widest-ranging account of religious philosophies ever written in pre-modern Tibet." This work discusses all schools of Tibetan Buddhism, Chinese Buddhism and Chinese religions as well as Indian, Mongolian and Khotanese religious systems.

The term Siddhānta is also used in a different way by some Buddhist treatises like the Da zhidu lun. In this text (and in the Chinese Tiantai school), the term Siddhāntas refers to four pedagogical principles used by the Buddha to teach others. According to David W. Chappell, the Four Siddhāntas are:

(1) First of all, the Buddha used ordinary or mundane modes of expression,

(2) then he individualized his teaching and adapted it to the capacities of his listeners,

(3) he further altered it in order to respond to and diagnose the spiritual defects of his hearers, and

(4) finally all his teaching was based on the perfect and highest wisdom. The first three are conditioned and finite, whereas the last is inconceivable and ineffable.

== Jain philosophical studies ==
For Jainism, the texts vary between the three primary sects, with Sthanakavasis believing in no textual authority. Both the Digambara and Śvetāmbara believe that the "purest" Jain teachings were contained within the Purvas, which have been mostly lost to antiquity. Of the surviving Jain scriptures, the Digambara tend to focus upon the Prakaranas; while the Śvetāmbara focus upon the Angas.

== Astronomy ==
In Indian astronomy and astrology, Siddhanta (or Siddhantic) refers to a genre of texts that replaced the earlier tradition based on the Vedanga Jyotisha. The Siddhanta ("established theory") genre emerged around the beginning of the first millennium CE. Compared to the Vedanga Jyotisha, the Siddhanta texts discussed a wider range of topics including the nakshatras, the zodiac signs, precise calculations of the solar year, computations of planetary motions and positions, calculation of solar and lunar eclipses, and parallax.

Early Indian astronomy is transmitted in Siddhantas: Varahamihira (6th century) in his Pancha-Siddhantika contrasts five of these: The Surya Siddhanta besides the Paitamaha Siddhantas (which is more similar to the "classical" Vedanga Jyotisha), the Paulisha and Romaka Siddhantas (directly based on Hellenistic astronomy, and also known through the Yavanajataka) and the Vasishtha Siddhanta.
