= Surya Siddhanta =

Sanskrit text on Indian astronomy

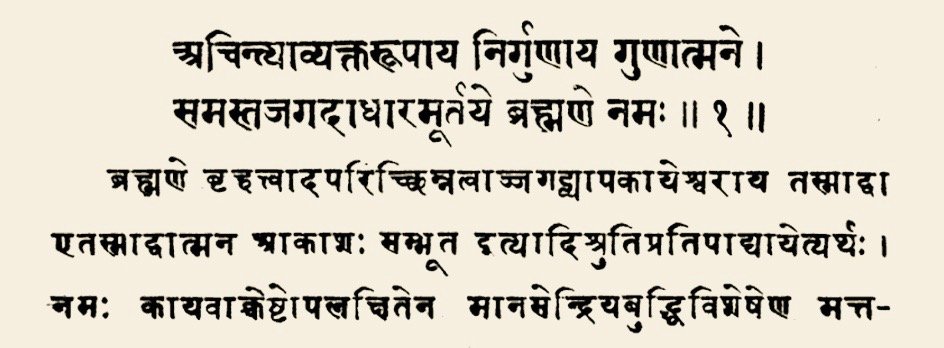
Verse 1.1 (prayer to Brahman)

The Surya Siddhanta (IAST: Sūrya Siddhānta; lit. 'Sun Treatise') is a Sanskrit treatise in Indian astronomy, attributed to Lāṭadeva, a student of Aryabhatta I, and dated to somewhere between the end of the 4th and 5th centuries by most modern scholars, and comprises fourteen chapters. The Surya Siddhanta describes the author's rules, within a geocentric model, to calculate the motions of the Sun, Moon, Mercury, Venus, Mars, Jupiter and Saturn, along with his estimate of their diameters, and the circumference of their assumed circular orbits around the Earth. The text is known from a 15th-century CE palm-leaf manuscript, and several newer manuscripts. It was composed or revised probably c. 800 CE from an earlier text also called the Surya Siddhanta. The Surya Siddhanta text is composed of verses made up of two lines, each broken into two halves, or pãds, of eight syllables each.

The second verse of the first chapter of the Surya Siddhanta attributes the words to an emissary of the solar deity of Hindu god, Surya, as recounted to an asura called Maya at the end of Satya Yuga, the first golden age from Hindu texts, around two million years ago.

The text asserts, according to Markanday and Srivatsava, that the Earth is of a spherical shape. It treats Earth as stationary globe around which the classical planets orbit. The calculations uses Yojana, a unit estimated as between 8 – 15 km. Though astronomical dimensions had already been estimated with more accuracy by ancient Greek astronomers such as Aristarchus (c. 310–230 BCE) and Eratosthenes (c. 276–194 BCE), Surya Siddhanta calculated the Earth's diameter to be 1,600 Yojana (12,800 - 24,000 km, the known measure being 12,756 km), the diameter of the Moon as 480 Yojana (3,840 - 7,200 km, the known measure being 3,475 km), the diameter of the Sun as 6,500 Yojana (52,000 - 97,509 km, the known measure being ~ 1,392,000 km) and the distance between the Moon and the Earth to be 51,600 Yojana (412,800 - 774,000 km, the known elliptical range being 221,500–252,700 miles (356,500–406,700 kilometres). The text is known for some of the earliest known discussions of fractions and trigonometric functions.

The Surya Siddhanta is one of several astronomy-related Hindu texts. It represents a functional system that made reasonably accurate predictions. The text was influential on the solar year computations of the luni-solar Hindu calendar. The text was translated into Arabic and was influential in medieval Islamic geography. The Surya Siddhanta has the largest number of commentators among all the astronomical texts written in India. It includes information about the mean orbital parameters of the planets, such as the number of mean revolutions per Mahayuga, the longitudinal changes of the orbits, and also includes supporting evidence and calculation methods.

== Textual history ==
In a work called the Pañca-siddhāntikā composed in the sixth century by Varāhamihira, five astronomical treatises are named and summarised: Paulīśa-siddhānta, Romaka-siddhānta, Vasiṣṭha-siddhānta, Sūrya-siddhānta, and Paitāmaha-siddhānta. Most scholars place the surviving version of the text variously from the 4th century to the 5th century CE.

According to John Bowman, the version of the text existed between 350 and 400 CE wherein it referenced fractions and trigonometric functions, but the text was a living document and revised through about the 10th century. One of the evidence for the Surya Siddhanta being a living text is the work of medieval Indian scholar Utpala, who cites and then quotes ten verses from a version of Surya Siddhanta, but these ten verses are not found in any surviving manuscripts of the text. According to Kim Plofker, large portions of the more ancient Sūrya-siddhānta was incorporated into the Panca siddhantika text, and a new version of the Surya Siddhanta was composed or revised around 800 CE from earlier text of the same name and large portions of which were preserved in Varāhamihira's 6th-century text. Some scholars refer to Panca siddhantika as the old Surya Siddhanta and date it to 505 CE.

=== Vedic influence ===
The Surya Siddhanta is a text on astronomy and time keeping, an idea that appears much earlier as the field of Jyotisha (Vedanga) of the Vedic period. The field of Jyotisha deals with ascertaining time, particularly forecasting auspicious dates and times for Vedic rituals. Vedic sacrifices state that the ancient Vedic texts describe four measures of time – savana, solar, lunar and sidereal, as well as twenty seven constellations using Taras (stars). According to mathematician and classicist David Pingree, in the Hindu text Atharvaveda (~1000 BCE or older) the idea already appears of twenty eight constellations and movement of astronomical bodies.

According to Pingree, the influence may have flowed the other way initially, then flowed into India after the arrival of Darius and the Achaemenid conquest of the Indus Valley about 500 BCE. The mathematics and devices for time keeping mentioned in these ancient Sanskrit texts, proposes Pingree, such as the water clock may also have thereafter arrived in India from Mesopotamia. However, Yukio Ôhashi considers this proposal as incorrect, suggesting instead that the Vedic timekeeping efforts, for forecasting appropriate time for rituals, must have begun much earlier and the influence may have flowed from India to Mesopotamia. Ôhashi states that it is incorrect to assume that the number of civil days in a year equal 365 in both Indian (Hindu) and Egyptian–Persian year. Further, adds Ôhashi, the Mesopotamian formula is different than Indian formula for calculating time, each can only work for their respective latitude, and either would make major errors in predicting time and calendar in the other region.

Kim Plofker states that while a flow of timekeeping ideas from either side is plausible, each may have instead developed independently, because the loan-words typically seen when ideas migrate are missing on both sides as far as words for various time intervals and techniques.

=== Greek influence ===
It is hypothesized that contacts between the ancient Indian scholarly tradition and Hellenistic Greece via the Indo-Greek Kingdom after the Indian campaign of Alexander the Great, specifically regarding the work of Hipparchus (2nd-century BCE), explain some similarities between Surya Siddhanta and Greek astronomy in the Hellenistic period. For example, Surya Siddhanta provides table of sines function which parallel the Hipparchian table of chords, though the Indian calculations are more accurate and detailed. According to Alan Cromer, the Greek influence most likely arrived in India by about 100 BCE. The Indians adopted the Hipparchus system, according to Cromer, and it remained that simpler system rather than those made by Ptolemy in the 2nd century.

The influence of Greek ideas on early medieval era Indian astronomical theories, particularly zodiac symbols (astrology), is broadly accepted by the Western scholars. According to Pingree, the 2nd-century CE cave inscriptions of Nasik mention sun, moon and five planets in the same order as found in Babylon, but "there is no hint, however, that the Indian had learned a method of computing planetary positions in this period". In the 2nd-century CE, a scholar named Yavanesvara translated a Greek astrological text, and another unknown individual translated a second Greek text into Sanskrit. Thereafter started the diffusion of Greek and Babylonian ideas on astronomy and astrology into India. The other evidence of European influential on the Indian thought is Romaka Siddhanta, a title of one of the Siddhanta texts contemporary to Surya Siddhanta, a name that betrays its origin and probably was derived from a translation of a European text by Indian scholars in Ujjain, then the capital of an influential central Indian large kingdom.

According to mathematician and historian of measurement John Roche, the astronomical and mathematical methods developed by Greeks related arcs to chords of spherical trigonometry. The Indian mathematical astronomers, in their texts such as the Surya Siddhanta, developed other linear measures of angles, made their calculations differently, "introduced the versine, which is the difference between the radius and cosine, and discovered various trigonometrical identities". For instance "where the Greeks had adopted 60 relative units for the radius, and 360 for circumference", the Indians chose 3,438 units and 60x360 for the circumference thereby calculating the "ratio of circumference to diameter [pi, π] of about 3.1414". The Surya Siddhanta was one of the two books in Sanskrit that were translated into Arabic in the later half of the eighth century during the reign of Abbasid caliph Al-Mansur.

== Importance in history of science ==
Astronomical calculations: Estimated time per sidereal revolution
Planet	Surya Siddhanta	Ptolemy	20th-century
Mangala (Mars)	686 days, 23 hours, 56 mins, 23.5 secs	686 days, 23 hours, 31 mins, 56.1 secs	686 days, 23 hours, 30 mins, 41.4 secs
Budha (Mercury)	87 days, 23 hours, 16 mins, 22.3 secs	87 days, 23 hours, 16 mins, 42.9 secs	87 days, 23 hours, 15 mins, 43.9 secs
Bṛhaspati (Jupiter)	4,332 days, 7 hours, 41 mins, 44.4 secs	4,332 days, 18 hours, 9 mins, 10.5 secs	4,332 days, 14 hours, 2 mins, 8.6 secs
Shukra (Venus)	224 days, 16 hours, 45 mins, 56.2 secs	224 days, 16 hours, 51 mins, 56.8 secs	224 days, 16 hours, 49 mins, 8.0 secs
Shani (Saturn)	10,765 days, 18 hours, 33 mins, 13.6 secs	10,758 days, 17 hours, 48 mins, 14.9 secs	10,759 days, 5 hours, 16 mins, 32.2 secs

The tradition of Hellenistic astronomy ended in the West after Late Antiquity. According to Cromer, the Surya Siddhanta and other Indian texts reflect the primitive state of Greek science, nevertheless played an important part in the history of science, through its translation in Arabic and stimulating the Arabic sciences. According to a study by Dennis Duke that compares Greek models with Indian models based on the oldest Indian manuscripts such as the Surya Siddhanta with fully described models, the Greek influence on Indian astronomy is strongly likely to be pre-Ptolemaic.

The Surya Siddhanta was one of the two books in Sanskrit translated into Arabic in the later half of the eighth century during the reign of Abbasid caliph Al-Mansur. According to Muzaffar Iqbal, this translation and that of Aryabhatta was of considerable influence on geographic, astronomy and related Islamic scholarship.

== Contents ==
The mean (circular) motion of planets according to the Surya Siddhantha.

The variation of the true position of Mercury around its mean position according to the Surya Siddhantha.

The contents of the Surya Siddhanta is written in classical Indian poetry tradition, where complex ideas are expressed lyrically with a rhyming meter in the form of a terse shloka. This method of expressing and sharing knowledge made it easier to remember, recall, transmit and preserve knowledge. However, this method also meant secondary rules of interpretation, because numbers don't have rhyming synonyms. The creative approach adopted in the Surya Siddhanta was to use symbolic language with double meanings. For example, instead of one, the text uses a word that means moon because there is one moon. To the skilled reader, the word moon means the number one. The entire table of trigonometric functions, sine tables, steps to calculate complex orbits, predict eclipses and keep time are thus provided by the text in a poetic form. This cryptic approach offers greater flexibility for poetic construction.

The Surya Siddhanta thus consists of cryptic rules in Sanskrit verse. It is a compendium of astronomy that is easier to remember, transmit and use as reference or aid for the experienced, but does not aim to offer commentary, explanation or proof. The text has 14 chapters and 500 shlokas. It is one of the eighteen astronomical siddhanta (treatises), but thirteen of the eighteen are believed to be lost to history. The Surya Siddhanta text has survived since the ancient times, has been the best known and the most referred astronomical text in the Indian tradition.

The fourteen chapters of the Surya Siddhanta are as follows, per the much cited Burgess translation:

1. Of the Mean Motions of the Planets
2. On the True Places of the Planets
3. Of Direction, Place and Time
4. Of Eclipses, and Especially of Lunar Eclipses
5. Of Parallax in a Solar Eclipse
6. The Projection of Eclipses
7. Of Planetary Conjunctions
8. Of the Asterisms
9. Of Heliacal (Sun) Risings and Settings
10. The Moon's Risings and Settings, Her Cusps
11. On Certain Malignant Aspects of the Sun and Moon
12. Cosmogony, Geography, and Dimensions of the Creation
13. Of the Armillary Sphere and other Instruments
14. Of the Different Modes of Reckoning Time

The methods for computing time using the shadow cast by a gnomon are discussed in both Chapters 3 and 13.

=== Description of Time ===
The author of Surya Siddhanta defines time as of two types: the first which is continuous and endless, destroys all animate and inanimate objects and second is time which can be known. This latter type is further defined as having two types: the first is Murta (Measureable) and Amurta (immeasureable because it is too small or too big). The time Amurta is a time that begins with an infinitesimal portion of time (Truti) and Murta is a time that begins with 4-second time pulses called Prana as described in the table below. The further description of Amurta time is found in Puranas where as Surya Siddhanta sticks with measurable time.

Time described in Surya Siddhanta
Type	Surya Siddhanta Units	Description	Value in modern units of time
Amurta	Truti	1/33750 seconds	29.6296 micro seconds
Murta	Prana	-	4 seconds
Murta	Pala	6 Pranas	24 seconds
Murta	Ghatika	60 Palas	24 minutes
Murta	Nakshatra Ahotra	60 Ghatikas	One Sidereal day

The text measures a savana day from sunrise to sunrise. Thirty of these savana days make a savana month. A solar (saura) month starts with the entrance of the sun into a zodiac sign, thus twelve months make a year.

The text further states there are nine modes of measuring time. "Of four modes, namely solar, lunar, sidereal, and civil time, practical use is made among men; by that of Jupiter is to be determined the year of the cycle of sixty years; of the rest, no use is ever made".

=== North pole star and South pole star ===
Surya Siddhanta asserts that there are two pole stars, one each at north and south celestial pole. Surya Siddhanta chapter 12 verse 43 description is as following:

मेरोरुभयतो मध्ये ध्रुवतारे नभ:स्थिते। निरक्षदेशसंस्थानामुभये क्षितिजाश्रिये॥१२:४३॥

This translates as "On both sides of the Meru (i.e. the north and south poles of the earth) the two polar stars are situated in the heaven at their zenith. These two stars are in the horizon of the cities situated on the equinoctial regions".

=== The Sine table ===
The Surya Siddhanta provides methods of calculating the sine values in chapter 2. It divides the quadrant of a circle with radius 3438 into 24 equal segments or sines as described in the table. In modern-day terms, each of these 24 segments has angle of 3.75°.

Table of Sines
No.	Sine	1st order differences	2nd order differences	No.	Sine	1st order differences	2nd order differences
0	0	-	-	13	2585	154	10
1	225	225	1	14	2728	143	11
2	449	224	2	15	2859	131	12
3	671	222	3	16	2978	119	12
4	890	219	4	17	3084	106	13
5	1105	215	5	18	3177	93	13
6	1315	210	5	19	3256	79	14
7	1520	205	6	20	3321	65	14
8	1719	199	8	21	3372	51	14
9	1910	191	8	22	3409	37	14
10	2093	183	9	23	3431	22	15
11	2267	174	10	24	3438	7	15
12	2431	164	10				

The 1st order difference is the value by which each successive sine increases from the previous and similarly the 2nd order difference is the increment in the 1st order difference values. Burgess says, it is remarkable to see that the 2nd order differences increase as the sines and each, in fact, is about 1/225th part of the corresponding sine.

=== Calculation of tilt of Earth's axis (Obliquity) ===
The tilt of the ecliptic varies between 22.1° to 24.5° and is currently 23.5°. Following the sine tables and methods of calculating the sines, Surya Siddhanta also attempts to calculate the Earth's tilt of contemporary times as described in chapter 2 and verse 28, the obliquity of the Earth's axis, the verse says "The sine of greatest declination is 1397; by this multiply any sine, and divide by radius; the arc corresponding to the result is said to be the declination". The greatest declination is the inclination of the plane of the ecliptic. With radius of 3438 and sine of 1397, the corresponding angle is 23.975° or 23° 58' 30.65" which is approximated to be 24°.

=== Planets and their characteristics ===
Question: How Can the Earth Be a Sphere?

Thus everywhere on the terrestrial globe (bhūgola),
people suppose their own place higher,
yet this globe (gola) is in space where there is no above nor below.

— Surya Siddhanta, XII.53
Translator: Scott L. Montgomery, Alok Kumar

The text treats earth as a stationary globe around which the sun, moon, and five planets orbit. It makes no mention of planets beyond Saturn or other objects in the Solar System. It presents mathematical formulae to calculate the orbits, diameters, predict their future locations and cautions that the minor corrections are necessary over time to the formulae for the various astronomical bodies.

The text describes some of its formulae with the use of very large numbers for "divya-yuga", stating that at the end of this yuga, Earth and all astronomical bodies return to the same starting point and the cycle of existence repeats again. These very large numbers based on divya-yuga, when divided and converted into decimal numbers for each planet, give reasonably accurate sidereal periods when compared to modern era western calculations.

Sidereal Periods
	Surya Siddhanta	Modern values
Moon	27.322 days	27.32166 days
Mercury	87.97 days	87.969 days
Mars	687 days	686.98 days
Venus	224.7 days	224.701 days
Jupiter	4,332.3 days	4,332.587 days
Saturn	10,765.77 days	10,759.202 days

=== Calendar ===
The solar part of the luni-solar Hindu calendar is based on the Surya Siddhanta. The various old and new versions of Surya Siddhanta manuscripts yield the same solar calendar. According to J. Gordon Melton, both the Hindu and Buddhist calendars that are in use in South and Southeast Asia are rooted in this text, but the regional calendars adapted and modified them over time.

The Surya Siddhanta calculates the solar year to be 365 days 6 hours 12 minutes and 36.56 seconds. On average, according to the text, the lunar month equals 27 days 7 hours 39 minutes 12.63 seconds. It states that the lunar month varies over time, and this needs to be factored in for accurate time keeping.

According to Whitney, the Surya Siddhanta calculations were tolerably accurate and achieved predictive usefulness. In Chapter 1 of Surya Siddhanta, "the Hindu year is too long by nearly three minutes and a half; but the moon's revolution is right within a second; those of Mercury, Venus and Mars within a few minutes; that of Jupiter within six or seven hours; that of Saturn within six days and a half".

The Surya Siddhanta was one of the two books in Sanskrit translated into Arabic during the reign of 'Abbasid caliph al-Mansur (r. 754–775 CE). According to Muzaffar Iqbal, this translation and that of Aryabhata was of considerable influence on geographic, astronomy and related Islamic scholarship.

== Editions ==
- The Súrya-Siddhánta, an antient system of Hindu astronomy ed. FitzEdward Hall and Bápú Deva Śástrin (1859).
- Translation of the Sûrya-Siddhânta: A text-book of Hindu astronomy, with notes and an appendix by Ebenezer Burgess Originally published: Journal of the American Oriental Society 6 (1860) 141–498. Commentary by Burgess is much larger than his translation.
- Surya-Siddhanta: A Text Book of Hindu Astronomy translated by Ebenezer Burgess, ed. Phanindralal Gangooly (1989/1997) with a 45-page commentary by P. C. Sengupta (1935).
- Translation of the Surya Siddhanta by Bapu Deva Sastri (1861) ISBN 3-7648-1334-2, ISBN 978-3-7648-1334-5. Only a few notes. Translation of Surya Siddhanta occupies first 100 pages; rest is a translation of the Siddhanta Siromani by Lancelot Wilkinson.

== Commentaries ==
The historical popularity of Surya Siddhanta is attested by the existence of at least 26 commentaries, plus another 8 anonymous commentaries. Some of the Sanskrit-language commentaries include the following; nearly all the commentators have re-arranged and modified the text:

- Surya-siddhanta-tika (1178) by Mallikarjuna Suri
- Surya-siddhanta-bhashya (1185) by Chandeshvara, a Maithila Brahmana
- Vasanarnava (c. 1375–1400) by Maharajadhiraja Madana-pala of Taka family
- Surya-siddhanta-vivarana (1432) by Parameshvara of Kerala
- Kalpa-valli (1472) by Yallaya of Andhra-desha
- Subodhini (1472) by Ramakrishna Aradhya
- Surya-siddhanta-vivarana (1572) by Bhudhara of Kampilya
- Kamadogdhri (1599) by Tamma Yajvan of Paragipuri
- Gudhartha-prakashaka (1603) by Ranganatha of Kashi
- Saura-bhashya (1611) by Nrsimha of Kashi
- Gahanartha-prakasha (IAST: Gūḍhārthaprakāśaka, 1628) by Vishvanatha of Kashi
- Saura-vasana (after 1658) by Kamalakara of Kashi
- Kiranavali (1719) by Dadabhai, a Chittpavana Brahmana
- Surya-siddhanta-tika (date unknown) by Kama-bhatta of southern India
- Ganakopakarini (date unknown) by Chola Vipashchit of southern India
- Gurukataksha (date unknown) by Bhuti-vishnu of southern India

Mallikarjuna Suri had written a Telugu language commentary on the text before composing the Sanskrit-language Surya-siddhanta-tika in 1178. Kalpakurti Allanarya-suri wrote another Telugu language commentary on the text, known from a manuscript copied in 1869.

== See also ==
- Hindu units of measurement
- Indian science and technology
- Adityas
