= Śatānanda =

Indian astronomer (11th century)

Śatānanda (fl. 1068–1099) was an Indian astronomer best known from his manual the Bhāsvatī (1099). Śatānanda is thought to have lived in Puri or Ujjain and drew from other texts including the Suryasiddhanta of Varahamihira.

Śatānanda was the son of Sankara and Saraswati, born in Puri, Odisha. He may have served in the court of the Kesari dynasty. Some sources suggest he lived in Ujjain. His name literally means the "joy of hundreds" in Sanskrit and he used centesimal numbering in his astronomical manual Bhasvati published in 1099. The book has eight short chapters with 128 verses which include methods for preparing almanacs. He also includes methods for computing the longitudinal positions of the planets. Using 528 CE as a reference he computed the annual precession rate as 1 minute. The sections include:

- Tithyādidhruvādhikāra (Tithi Dhruva)
- Grāhadhruvādhikāra (Graha Dhruva)
- Pancāngaspastādhikāra (Calculation of Calendar)
- Grahaspasfādhikāra (True place of Planets)
- Triprasnādhikāra (Three problems: Time, Place and Direction)
- Chandragrahanâdhikâra (Lunar Eclipse)
- Sûryagrahanādhikāra (Solar Eclipse)
- Parilekhādhikāra (Sketch or graphical presentations of eclipses)

Several contemporary commentaries of the book were also published. Aniruddha, a son of Bhavadasa of Varanasi, wrote a commentary (tika) on Satananda's Bhasvati in 1495 CE.
