= Pancha-siddhantika =

6th-century Sanskrit text written by astronomer Varāhamihira

Pancha-siddhantika (IAST: Pañca-siddhāntikā) is a 6th-century CE Sanskrit-language text written by astrologer-astronomer Varāhamihira in present-day Ujjain, India. It summarizes the contents of the treatises of the five contemporary schools of astronomy (siddhantas) prevalent in India.

== Date ==
The text refers to the Shaka year 427, which corresponds to 505 CE. Indian writers on astrology and astronomy generally chose an epoch year close to the date of composition of their texts, in order to facilitate correct astronomical calculations. Thus, 505 CE was most probably the year in which Varāhamihira composed Pancha-Siddhantaka or began planning it. The writings of both Varāhamihira and his commentator Utpala suggest that the text was Varāhamihira's first work.

However, some scholars believe that 505 CE was the year of Varāhamihira's birth or of another important event in his life. This is because according to Amaraja, the author of a commentary on Brahmagupta's Khanda-khadyaka, Varāhamihira died in 587 CE (Shaka year 509). If Varāhamihira wrote Pancha-siddhantika in 505 CE even at the young age of 25, he must have been over 105 years old at the time of his death, which seems exceptionally high to these scholars. Consequently, these scholars date Varāhamihira's lifespan to 505-587 CE. Other scholars doubt the accuracy of Amaraja's statement, since he lived a thousand years after Varāhamihira.

== Contents ==
The text discusses five contemporary astronomical schools and their treatises, listed in order of importance, the last two regarded as inferior:

- Surya Siddhanta (or Saura Siddhanta), the treatise of the Sun
- Romaka Siddhanta, the treatise of Romans or westerners
- Paulisa Siddhanta, the treatise of Pulisha (IAST: Pauliśa, possibly Paulos)
- Vasishtha Siddhanta, the treatise of the sage Vasishtha (IAST: Vāsiṣṭha)
- Paitāmaha Siddhanta, the treatise of Pitamaha (the deity Brahma)

Varāhamihira's text summarizes the contents of the astronomical treatises of these schools: these treatises, at least in their original form, are now lost. For example, the surviving version of the Surya Siddhanta can be dated to 1000 CE, although its original version may have been composed around 400 CE. Similarly, the Paitamaha Siddhanta referred to by Varāhamihira was probably composed in the early 5th century (distinct from an even earlier work of the same name), but the present-day text is a later work that survives as part of a Purana text. Thus, Varāhamihira's text is the only source about these ancient treatises. Varāhamihira mentions several rules from these texts, but sometimes, it is not clear which rule is from which text.

Varāhamihira refers to his Pancha-siddhantika as Karana (a concise exposition of astronomy), but the text covers a wider range of topics compared to the texts belonging to the karana genre.

Notable mathematical concepts in the Pancha-siddhantika include:

- Use of the decimal notation with its place-value number system
- Arithmetic addition and subtraction operations involving zero
- Associating sines with arcs at an intervals of 30°/8, thus implying that pi = square root of 10 = 3.16

Like Brahma-gupta, Varāhamihira rejects Aryabhata's view (now universally accepted) that the earth revolves around the sun.

Utpala suggests that Varāhamihira wrote an abridged version of the Pancha-siddhantika, but that work is now lost. Shatananda based his Bhasvati-karana (c. 1098 CE) on the Surya Siddhanta section of the Pancha-siddhantika.

== Editions ==
Printed editions of the text include:

- 1889, Varanasi: Edited by George Thibaut and Sudhakara Dvivedi, with a Sanskrit commentary by Dvivedi
  - 1970: English translation by Otto E. Neugebauer and David Pingree
- 1993, Chennai: Edited and translated by T. S. Kuppanna Sastry and K. Venkateswara Sarma
