= Varāhamihira =

Indian mathematician-astronomer-astrologer (505–587)

- Born: c. 20/21 March 505 (Note: Birthdate is disputed, see § Date) possibly Kapitthaka (identified with Kayatha or Sankissa)
- Died: c.587 (aged 81–82) (disputed; see § Date)
- Occupation: astrologer-astronomer
- Writing career
- Notable works: Pancha-siddhantika, Brhat-samhita, Brihajjataka

Varāhamihira (c. 20/21 March 505 – c. 587), also called Varāha or Mihira, was an ancient Indian mathematician and astronomer who lived in Ujjain (ancient Avanti region in present-day Madhya Pradesh, India. He is considered one of the foremost scholars of classical Indian astronomy. He mastered the three divisions (skandhatraya) of Jyotiṣa: mathematical astronomy (gaṇita), natural sciences (saṃhitā), and horoscopy (horā). His masterwork, the Pañcasiddhāntikā (treatise on five siddhāntas), is the primary surviving historical record of ancient Indian astronomical systems. His mathematical contributions include methods for computing sine tables and early trigonometric techniques and works on combinators.

== Date ==
Unlike other prominent ancient Indian astronomers, Varāhamihira does not mention his date. However, based on hints in his works, modern scholars date him to the 6th century CE; possibly, he also lived during the last years of the 5th century.

In his Pancha-siddhantika, Varāhamihira refers to the year 427 of the Shaka-kala (also Shakendra-kala or Shaka-bhupa-kala). Identifying this calendar era with the Shaka era places Varāhamihira in the 505 CE. Alternative theories identify this calendar era with other eras, placing him before the 5th century CE. However, these theories are inaccurate, as Varāhamihira must have lived after Aryabhata (born 476 CE), whose work he refers to. The particulars of the date mentioned by Varāhamihira - Shukla pratipada of the Chaitra month of the Shaka year 427 - align accurately with 20–21 March 505 CE. Al-Biruni also places Varāhamihira in 505 CE.

In accordance with the contemporary tradition, 575CE was most probably the year in which Varāhamihira composed Pancha-Siddhantaka or began planning it. However, some scholars believe that it was the year of Varāhamihira's birth or of another important event in his life. This is because according to Amaraja, the author of a commentary on Brahmagupta's Khanda-khadyaka, Varāhamihira died in 587 CE (Shaka year 509). If Varāhamihira wrote his work in 575

CE even at the young age of 25, he must have been over 105 years old at the time of his death, which seems exceptionally high to these scholars. Consequently, these scholars consider date Varāhamihira's lifespan to 505-587 CE. Other scholars doubt the accuracy of Amaraja's statement, since he lived a thousand years after Varāhamihira.

According to a historically inaccurate tradition, Varāhamihira was associated with the first century BCE legendary emperor Vikramaditya. This tradition is based on Jyotirvid-abharana, a work attributed to Kalidasa, which states that Varāhamihira (along with Kalidasa) was one of the navaratnas ("nine gems") at Vikramaditya's court. However, this text is a literary forgery, and is dated variously from 12th-18th century. Varāhamihira definitely did not live in the same century as some of the purported "Navaratnas", such as the much older Kalidasa.

== Early life ==
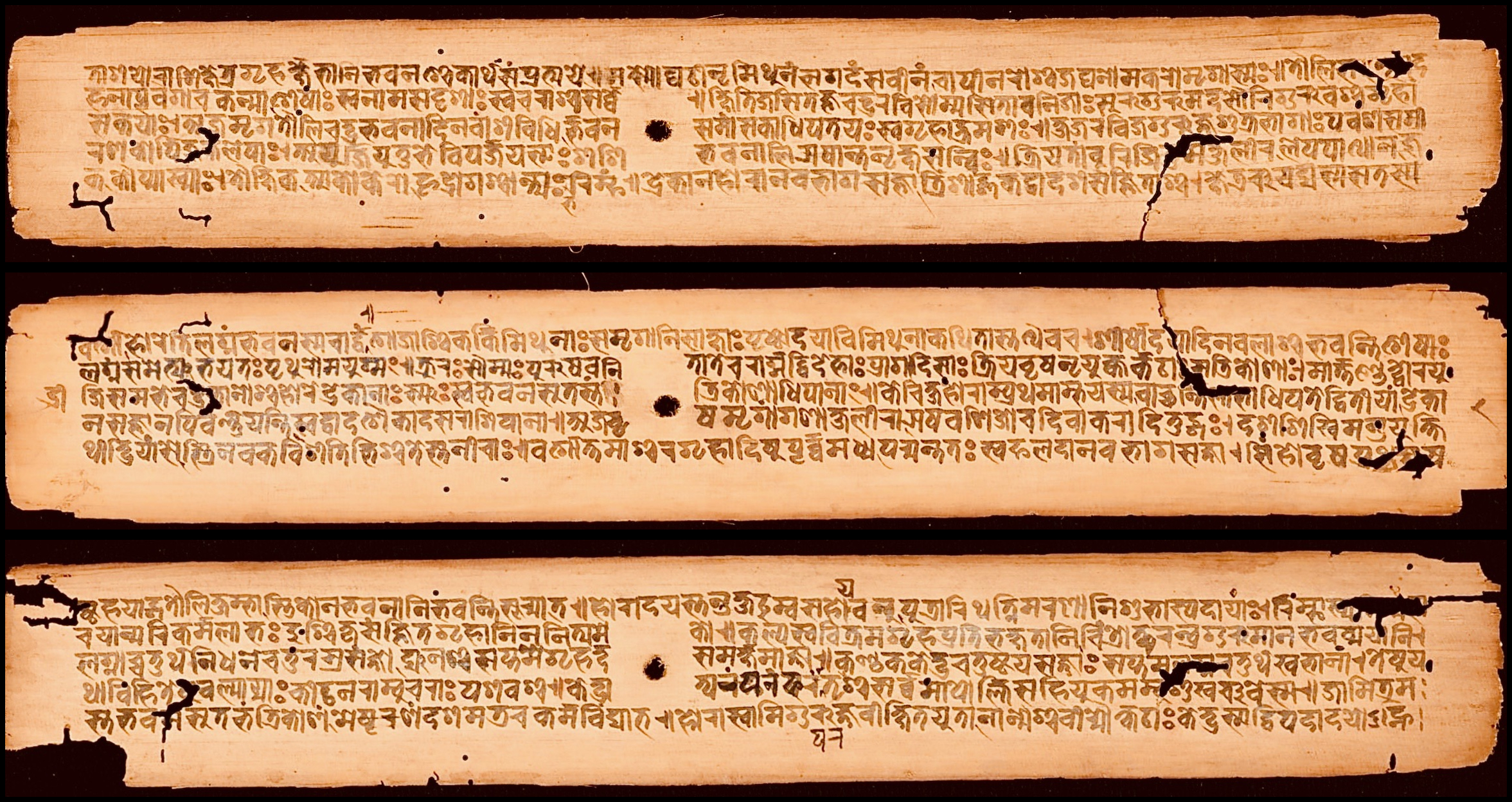
1399 CE manuscript of the Brihajjataka

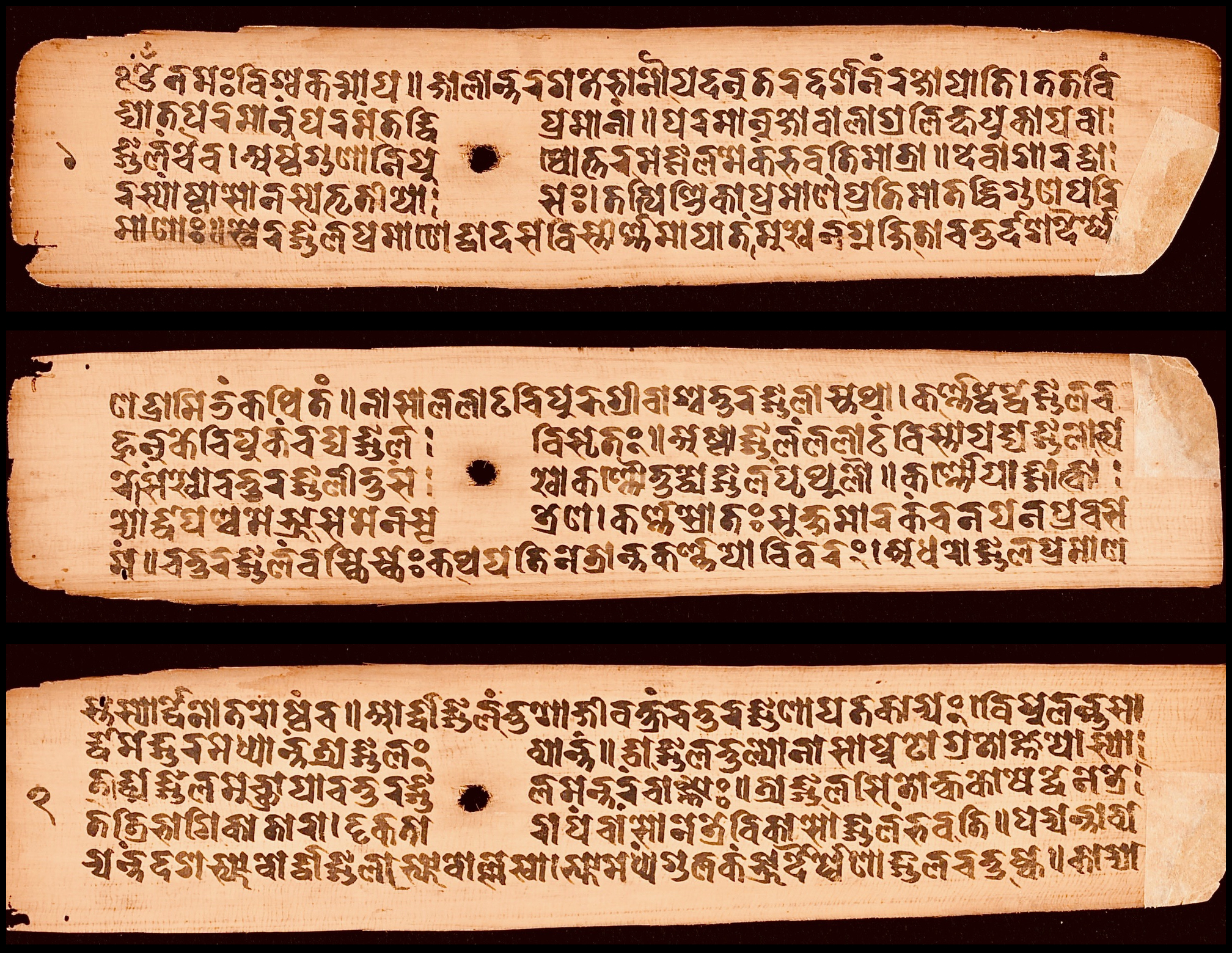
1279 CE manuscript of the Brhat-samhita

Much of the undisputed information about the life of Varāhamihira comes from a stanza in his Brhaj-jataka. According to this stanza, he was a resident of Avanti, was a son of Aditya-dasa, studied at Kapitthaka, and was favoured through the boon of the sun god.

=== Ancestry ===
Varāhamihira's father Aditya-dasa likely trained him in jyotisha (Indian astrology and astronomy), as suggested by the Brhaj-jataka stanza and the opening stanza of Pancha-siddhantika.

Varāhamihira's commentator Utpala calls him "Magadha-dvija". According to one interpretation, this means that Varāhamihira was Brahmana (dvija), whose ancestors belonged to the Magadha region.

According to another theory, the word "Magadha" in this context refers to the sun-worshipping Maga cult that Varāhamihira was a part of. In his Brhat-samhita, Varāhamihira mentions that the Magas were the only people suitable for consecrating an image of the Sun god. The Magas, as they came to be known in India, originated from the Magi priests of the Achaemenid Empire. Historian Ajay Mitra Shastri cites a Bhavishya Purana passage according to which the term "Magadha" is a synonym of "Maga" and refers to "those who contemplate on the Maga". According to Shastri, Utpala has used the word "Magadha" to denote the Magas, who had been accepted as Shaka-dvipi (Maga) Brahmins in the Indian society.

Shastri theorizes that "Varaha-mihira" may be a Sanskritized form of the Iranian name "Varaza-Mihr", and may refer to a legend mentioned in the Mihr Yasht of the Avesta. According to this legend, the god Verethraghna, in the form of a boar (varaza), precedes Mihr in his march. Shastri notes that the 5th century Sassanian monarch Bahram V bore the name Mihrvaraza, which is quite similar to Varahamihra. Academic J.E. Sanjana suggests that Varāhamihira was descended from an Iranian Magi priest. However, A. N. Upadhye argued that native Sanskrit sound changes and anaptyxis could be a phonetic derivation, directly from the Vedic word "Mitrá".

Some scholars, such as M.T. Patwardhan and A.N. Upadhye, have identified Varāhamihira with Bazurjmehr, mentioned in Firishta's writings as a minister of the Sasanian king Khusraw Nushirwan (r. 531-578). However, A.M. Shastri dismisses this theory as unconvincing.

There are several historically inaccurate legends about the ancestry of Varāhamihira:

- Jain writers Merutunga (14th century) and Rajashekhara-Suri claim that his original name was Varaha, and he was a brother of the Jain patriarch Bhadrabahu. He gained knowledge because of a favour by the Sun, because of which the suffix "Mihira" ("Sun") was added to his name. Jain authors seem to have fabricated this story to prove the pre-eminence of the Jain astrology over the Brahmanical astrology.
- Another 20th century legend, purportedly based on "some old Gujarati text" claims that Aditya-dasa's wife was called Satya-vati alias Indu-mati: Varāhamihira was born to them in their fifties by the boon of the Sun. He was originally known as Mihira, and was given the prefix "Varaha" by King Vikramaditya when he correctly predicted that a boar (varaha in Sanskrit) would kill the king's son.
- A tradition associates Varāhamihira with Berachampa in West Bengal, where a mound called "Varāhamihira's house" is located. This seems to be the result of an attempt to associate the locality with a famous figure. A legend from the Bengal region claims that Varaha and Mihira were a father-son duo at Vikramaditya's court, and the poet Khana was Mihira's wife. This legend is of no historical value. "Varaha" and "Mihira" were alternative names for the same person - Varāhamihira, as attested by the later astronomical works.
- Another legend claims that the Mimamsa teacher Shabara-svamin had four wives, one from each varna, and Varāhamihira was his son from his Brahmin wife. Some scholars, such as S.K. Dikshit, have theorized that Aditya-dasa (or Aditya-deva) was another name of Shabara-svamin, but no historical evidence supports this tradition.

=== Birthplace ===
Kapitthaka, where Varāhamihira studied, was probably his birthplace. While "Kapitthaka" is the most popular reading the place's name, several variants of this name appear in various manuscripts, including Kampilyaka, (Note: Sudhakara Dvivedi, following the reading "Kampilyaka", identified Varahamihira's birthplace as present-day Kalpi in Uttar Pradesh. However, this identification is incorrect: the ancient name of Kalpi was Kalapriya, not Kampilyaka.) Kapilaka, Kapishthala, and Kapishkala. Utpala suggests that this village had a sun temple. According to one theory, Kapitthaka is the modern Kayatha, an archaeological site near Ujjain. Statues of the sun deity Surya (whom Varāhamihira worshipped) dated 600-900 CE have been found there, and kapittha trees are abundant in and around Kayatha. However, no historical source suggests that Kapitthaka was another name for Kayatha. According to another theory, Kapitthaka is same as Sankissa (ancient Sankashya) in present-day Uttar Pradesh: according to the 7th-century Chinese traveler Xuanzang, this town was also known as Kah-pi-t'a. Historian Ajay Mitra Shastri notes that Kah-pi-t'a is phonetically similar to Kapittha or Kapitthaka.

Based on the term "Magadha-dvija" (see above), Sudhakara Dvivedi suggests that Varāhamihira was born and brought up in Magadha, and later migrated to Ujjain. Shastri disputes this, noting that Utpala describes him as "Avantikacharya" (Acharya of Avanti) and "Magadha-dvija": these two terms cannot be reconciled if "Magadha-dvija" is interpreted as "Dvija (Brahmana) of Magadha"; instead "Magadha" here means Maga, as attested by the Bhavishya Purana.

== Residence ==
Besides the above-mentioned stanza, Varāhamihira's association with Avanti is confirmed by other evidence: in Pancha-siddhantika, he calls himself Avantyaka ("of Avanti"), and the later commentators such as Utpala and Mahidhara describe him as Avantikacharya ("acharya of Avanti"). Utpala also describes Varāhamihira's son Prthu-yashas as Avantikacharya, in his commentary on Shat-panchashika.

Historian Ajay Mitra Shastri, relying on Utpala, believes that "Avanti" here refers to the city of Ujjayini in the Avanti region of central India. Scholar Dániel Balogh, however, notes that Avanti here may refer to the city of Ujjayini or the Avanti region in general: there is no concrete evidence that Varāhamihira lived in the city; he may have lived elsewhere in Avanti.

=== Royal patron ===
Varāhamihira likely lived in the Aulikara kingdom, as the Aulikaras ruled Avanti in the 6th century CE. Varāhamihira's Brhat-samhita states that on the topic of omens (shakuna), one of the works he consulted was that of Dravya-vardhana, the king of Avanti. Dravya-vardhana likely belonged to the Aulikara dynasty, several of whose members bore names ending in -vardhana.

Historian Ajay Mitra Shastri notes that Dravya-vardhana is the only person for whom Varāhamihira employs the honorific Shri, although he mentions several other notable people. Moreover, he mentions Dravya-vardhana's work before he mentions reputed authorities such as the Saptarishis and Garga. According to Shastri, this, combined with the fact that both Dravya-vardhana and Varāhamihira lived in Avanti, suggests that Dravya-vardhana was the royal patron of Varāhamihira. Shastri theorizes that Dravya-vardhana was a successor of Yashodharman alias Vishnu-vardhana, who may have also been a patron of Varāhamihira.

Some other historians identify Dravya-vardhana with the earlier Aulikara ruler Drapa-vardhana. Shastri disputes this, arguing that Varāhamihira describes Dravya-vardhana as a maharajadhiraja (emperor), while the Rīsthal inscription describes Drapa-vardhana as a senapati (commander). Balogh disagrees with Shastri, noting that Varāhamihira actually uses the term nrpo maharajadhiraja-kah (nrpa or ruler "connected to the emperor") for the king, which Shastri has misunderstood as maharajadhirajah (emperor). Only one manuscript reads maharajadhirajah, which can be discarded as it doesn't fit the metre; three others have maharajdhiraja-jah. Thus, the actual title of Drapa-vardhana was nrpa, which is much closer to senapati in status. Utpala also interprets the term maharajadhiraja-kah to mean "born in the dynasty of the (or an) emperor". Hans Bakker interprets the term to maharajadhiraja-kah as a governor installed at Ujjayini by the contemporary Gupta emperor. Balogh believes that Dravya-vardhana was probably same as Drapa-vardhana: "Dravya" may be a variant arising from a mistake in a medieval manuscript, which is the source of later manuscripts.

Balogh disputes Shastri's assertion that Varāhamihira shows a particularly reverential attitude to the king, and even if he did, this is no evidence that the two were contemporaries. Varāhamihira consulted the king's work instead of the original work of Bharadvaja that it was based on; according to Balogh, this actually makes it more likely that the king lived at a time earlier than Varāhamihira, who did not have access to the older work of Bharadvaja.

According to Balogh, Varāhamihira likely lived during the reign of the Aulikara kings Prakasha-dharman, Yashodharman, or an unknown successor of Yashodharman. However, unlike Shastri, Balogh believes that Varāhamihira did not have a royal patron.

== Religion ==
Several scholars theorize that Varāhamihira came from a Brahminized family of the sun-worshipping Magi priests (see Ancestry above). He was a worshipper of the sun god Savitur, and stated that he had received all his knowledge by the grace of this god. For example, in Brhaj-jataka, he states that he was able to compose the text because of a boon by the Sun. While he mentions other deities, he devotes a much larger number of verses to the Sun. His commentator Utpala credits his sharp intellect to a boon by the Sun. Some later writers describe him as an incarnation of the Sun god. Utpala, for example, declares that the Sun descended on earth in the form of Varāhamihira to save the jyotisha-shastra from destruction. The Subhashita-ratna-kosha quotes stanzas that praise Varāhamihira as an incarnation of Vishnu and the Sun, presumably because of two parts of his name (varaha referring to an avatar of Vishnu, and mihira meaning sun).

Sun worship seems to have been his family's religion, as his father Aditya-dasa's name literally means "servant of the Sun". Kutuhula-manjari, a later text, suggests that Varāhamihira was born to Aditya-dasa by the blessings of the Sun. Varāhamihira's son Prthu-yashas also invokes the Sun in the opening stanza of his work Shatpanchashikha.

Varāhamihira was well-versed with the Vedic tradition. He recommends the performance of several ancient Hindu rituals such as Punyaham and chanting of Vedic hymns.

Varāhamihira praises Vishnu in the chapters 42 and 104 of Brhat-samhita, leading A.N.S. Aiyangar and K.V.R Aiyangar to speculate that he came in contact with the Shrivaishnava saints (Alvars); however, A.M. Shastri dismisses this theory, describing the praise for Vishnu as an example of religious eclecticism.

In Brhat-samhita, Varāhamihira discusses the iconography of several Brahmanical deities, including Vishnu, Baladeva, Ekanamsha, Shamba, Pradyumna, consorts of Shamba and Pradyumna, Brahma, Skanda, Indra, Shiva, Surya, the divine mothers (Matrikas), Revanta, Yama, Varuna, and Kubera. These were presumably the popular gods worshipped during his period. He also describes the iconography of two non-Brahmanical faiths, that of the Buddha and the Jinas. He appears to have been religiously liberal, as he reveres the Buddha as "the father of the world" and devotes an entire stanza to Buddha's iconology (compared to shorter descriptions of several Brahmanical deities). A verse in the Brhat-samhita describes the iconography of Ganesha, but this verse appears only in one or two manuscripts, and is likely a later interpolation. Similarly, a Tikanika-yatra verse in which the author reveres Ganesha (among other deities), is likely spurious; this verse appears only in one manuscript.

== Works ==
Varāhamihira is credited with writing several authoritative texts on astronomy and astrology. He was also known for his poetic skills, and the 11th-century writer Kshemendra describes him as a great poet.

He apparently wrote a set of two works - detailed and short - in the following areas:

Area	Detailed work	Short work
Mathematical astronomy (tantra)	Pancha-siddhantika	Now lost, known from Utpala's commentary
Horoscopy (hora): nativity	Brhaj-jataka	Laghu-jataka
Horoscopy: marriage	Brhad-vivaha-patala	Svalpa-vivaha-patala
Horoscopy: journeys	Brhad-yatra and Yoga-yatra	Svalpa-yatra
General astrology (samhita)	Brhat-samhita	Samasa-samhita

=== Pañcasiddhāntikā ===
Written in 6th-century CE, Pañcasiddhāntikā (treatise on the five Siddhāntas) is one of the most critical comparative texts in the history of Indian science. It is a karaṇa (practical computational manual) rather than a full theoretical Siddhānta. Varāhamihira presents the essential and usable rules from five earlier astronomical systems that were prevalent in India in the early centuries CE. The original full texts of most of these five Siddhāntas are now lost and hence this comparative text of Varāhamihira remains the primary source for understanding them. Varāhamihira compares and evaluates these Siddhāntas based on their observational and computational accuracy (sphuṭatva):

- Sūrya Siddhānta: Evaluatd by Varāhamihira as the most accurate (sphuṭatara) of the five systems. It presents detailed models of planetary motion and methods for calculating solar and lunar eclipses, employing parameters corresponding to epicyclic corrections.
- Pauliśa Siddhānta:An Indian astronomical tradition containing elements derived from Greek astronomical sources, reflecting the transmission and adaptation of Hellenistic astronomy in India. Its attribution to Paulus of Alexandria is uncertain.
- Romaka Siddhānta: A treatise based on Greece and Roman influence that utilized the lunisolar cycle of Meton adapted by Hipparchus (the 2,850-year cycle) and chord-sine trigonometry.
- Vāsiṣṭha Siddhānta: An older indigenous computational system that utilized non-uniform signs and rudimentary motion algorithms.
- Paitāmaha Siddhānta: It is the oldest and least accurate (dūrabhrāṣṭa) among the five which utilized semi-astronimical calendar system relying on five-year lunisolar cycle.

The Pañcasiddhāntikā uses the decimal place-value system (with operations involving zero), trignometric sine tables and identities (with approximations of $\pi \approx \sqrt{10}$), along with practical rules for planetary positions. It is one of the most important sources for the state of Hindu astronomy in the centuries before the classical Siddhānta period of Āryabhaṭa and Brahmagupta. Modern editions and translations (notably by G.Thibaut & Sudhakara Dvivedi, O. Neugebauer & David Pingree, and T.S.Kuppanna Sastry & K.V.Sarma) have made it central to the history of science in India.

The chronological order of some of these works can be determined based on the internal evidence and Utpala's commentary. In order or earliest to latest, these works are:

- Brhaj-jataka
- Brhad-yatra
- Yoga-yatra (according to Utpala, Varaha-mihira wrote this because he was dissatisfied with Brhad-yatra)
- Brhad-vivaha-patala
- Brhat-samhita

Laghu-jataka states that it was written after Brhaj-jataka, and Utpala's commentary states that it was written after the abridged version of Pancha-siddhantika. However, its order with respect to the other works is not certain.

Later authors also mention or quote from some other works composed by Varaha-mihira. Manuscripts of some other works attributed to Varaha-mihira exist, but these attributions are of doubtful nature.

== Mathematics ==
=== Combinatorics and algebra ===
Among Varāhamihira's contributions to mathematics was a method for computing the binomial coefficient. In Bṛhat Saṃhitā, while discussing methods for formulating perfumes from various ingredients, he arranged the combination of $n$ items taken $r$ at a time into a table (a form of loṣṭaka-prasthāra). He obtained each entry by adding the value immediately below it to the one immediately to its left. Although presented in a different orientation, this recursive construction is mathematically equivalent to what is now known as Pascal's triangle for generating binomial coefficients.

=== Trigonometry ===
In the Pañcasiddhāntikā, Varāhamihira has made significant contributions to plane and spherical trigonometry by systematizing the use of jyā (half-chord/sine) and koṭi-jyā (cosine) functions.

He formulated several fundamental trigonometric identities that correspond in modern notation to:

- The Pythagorean trigonometric identity:

$\sin^2 x + \cos^2 x = 1$ expressed in Indian arc-radius measure as $\text{Jyā}^2(x) + \text{Koti-jyā}^2(x) = R^2$

- The co-function identity:

$\sin x = \cos\left(\frac{\pi}{2} - x\right)$

- The half-angle formula for sine calculations:

$\sin^2\left(\frac{x}{2}\right) = \frac{1 - \cos x}{2}$

Varāhamihira also improved the precision of the 24-step sine tables introduced by Aryabhata, by calculating intermediate values at finer intervals (down to 3°45′ arc intervals). He also provided linear interpolation techniques for astronomical sighting calculations.

=== Magic square ===
The oldest dateable fourth order magic square in the world is found in Varāhamihira's Brhat Samhita. The magic square is constructed for the purpose of making perfumes using 4 substances selected from 16 different substances. Each cell of the square represents a particular ingredient, while the number in the cell represents the proportion of the associated ingredient, such that the mixture of any four combination of ingredients along the columns, rows, diagonals, and so on, gives the total volume of the mixture to be 18. Although the book is mostly about divination, the magic square is given as a matter of combinatorial design, and no magical properties are attributed to it. The special features of this magic square were commented on by Bhattotpala (c. 900 CE)

2	3	5	8
5	8	2	3
4	1	7	6
7	6	4	1

10	3	13	8
5	16	2	11
4	9	7	14
15	6	12	1

The square of Varāhamihira as given above has sum of 18. Here the numbers 1 to 8 appear twice in the square. It is a pan-diagonal magic square. Four different magic squares can be obtained by adding 8 to one of the two sets of 1 to 8 sequence. The sequence is selected such that the number 8 is added exactly twice in each row, each column and each of the main diagonals. One of the possible magic squares shown in the right side. This magic square is remarkable in that it is a 90 degree rotation of a magic square that appears in the 13th century Islamic world as one of the most popular magic squares.

== Influences ==
The Romaka Siddhanta ("The Doctrine of the Romans") and the Paulisa Siddhanta were two works of Western origin which influenced Varāhamihira's thought. The Pauliṣa Siddhānta is often mistakenly thought to be a single work and attributed to Paul of Alexandria (c. 378 CE). However, this notion has been rejected by other scholars in the field, notably by David Pingree who stated that "...the identification of Paulus Alexandrinus with the author of the Pauliṣa Siddhānta is totally false". A number of his writings share similarities with the earlier texts like Vedanga Jyotisha.

Some scholars consider Varāhamihira to be the strong candidate for the one who understood and introduced the zodiac signs, predictive calculations for auspicious ceremonies and astrological computations in India.

Varāhamihira's works contain 35 Sanskritized Greek astronomical terms, and he exhibits a good understanding of the Greek astronomy. He praised the Greeks (Yavanas) for being "well trained in the sciences", though impure in ritual order.

== Legacy ==
Varāhamihira gained reputation as the most eminent writer on jyotisha after his death, and his works superseded nearly all the earlier Indian texts in this area. Several later Indian astrologer-astronomers speak highly of him, and acknowledge his works among their main sources. The 11th-century writer Al-Biruni also greatly admires him, describing him as an excellent astronomer.

== See also ==
- List of Indian mathematicians
