= Yavanajataka =

Hindu astrological text

The Yavanajātaka (Sanskrit: yavana 'Greek' + jātaka 'nativity' = 'nativity according to the Greeks') is an early Indian jyotiṣa text that represents an original amalgamation of Indian and Greek astral sciences.

In a foundational 1978 study, David Pingree proposed that the text was a Sanskrit versification composed in 269/270 CE by Sphujidhvaja, whom he described as an “Indianized Greek”, based on an earlier Greek prose original written by Yavaneśvara in Alexandria in 149/150 CE. Pingree also argued that the text contained the earliest Indian references to a decimal place-value system with zero and to bhūtasamkhyā (word-numeral) expressions.

Subsequent scholarship by Bill M. Mak, drawing on newly discovered manuscript sources, has substantially challenged these conclusions. According to these reassessments, Pingree’s claims concerning zero and bhūtasamkhyā were based on faulty emendations. The text also contains numerous indigenous Indian elements, including Ayurveda, Hindu deities, and traditional military astrology, that are absent from Greek sources. These features render the prose version extremely unlikely to have been Greek. Consequently, Yavaneśvara has been interpreted as an attributed source or traditional designation rather than necessarily a historical author. No evidence has been found for the existence of a Greek prose text from which Sphujidhvaja versified, as proposed by Pingree. The distinctive yuga system described in the text suggests that it represents a transitional stage in the development of Indian jyotiṣa, adapting and modifying earlier works such as the Vedāṅgajyotiṣa. The date of the Yavanajātaka remains disputed, with proposed dates ranging from after 22 CE to the early seventh century.

Yavanajataka is one of the earliest known Sanskrit works referencing Greek horoscopy. It was followed by other works of Greek origin which greatly influenced Indian astrology: the Paulisa Siddhanta ("Doctrine of Paul") and the Romaka Siddhanta ("Doctrine of the Romans"). However, some Indian authors claim the earliest known Sanskrit work on horoscopy is Vedanga Jyotisha

It was translated by David Pingree into English, which was published as volume 48 of the Harvard Oriental Series in 1978.

== Genesis ==
The last verses of the text describe the role of Yavanesvara in the creation of the text, and the role of Sphujidhvaja in its subsequent versification:

- "Previously Yavanesvara (the lord of the Greeks), whose vision of the truth came by favor of the Sun and whose language is flawless, translated this ocean of words, this jewel-mine of horoscopy, which was guarded by its being written in his tongue (i.e., Greek), but the truth of which was seen by the foremost of kings (in the year) 71; (he translated) this science of genethlialogy for the instruction of the world by means of excellent words." (Chapter 79/60-61 The Yavanajataka of Sphujidhvaja)

- "There was a wise king named Sphujidhvaja who versified this entire (text), which was seen by him in the year 191, in 4,000 indravajra verses." (Chapter 79/62 The Yavanajataka of Sphujidhvaja)

The dates employed in the Yavanajataka are based on the Saka era (see Chapter 79/14 "When 66 years of the Sakas have elapsed..."), meaning that the translation of the text into Sanskrit was made by Yavanesvara in 149 CE (year 71 of the Saka era, which starts in 78 CE). Accordingly, the versification by Sphujidhvaja was made in 269 CE.

The Yavanajataka contains instructions on calculating astrological charts (horoscopes) from the time and place of one's birth. Astrology flourished in the Hellenistic world (particularly Alexandria) and the Yavanajataka reflects astrological techniques developed in the Greek-speaking world. Astronomical mathematical methods, such as the calculate of the 'horoskopos' (zodiac sign on the eastern horizon) was used in the service of astrology.

== References to Greek astrology ==
There are various direct references to Greek astrological knowledge in the text, and the nomenclature is clearly taken from the Greek language:

- "The seventh place from the ascendent, the descendent, is called jamitra (diametros) in the language of the Greeks; the tenth from the ascendent, the mid-heaven, they say, is the mesurana (mesouranema)." (Chapter 1/49 The Yavanajataka of Sphujidhvaja)

- "This is said to be the method of determining the strength or weakness of the signs and planets according to the teaching of the Greeks; they say that, of the complete set of influences in horoscopy, there is an enormous number..." (Chapter 1/92 The Yavanajataka of Sphujidhvaja)

- "Thirty-six are the thirds of the zodiacal signs which are called Drekanas (dekanos) by the Greeks. They have various clothes, forms, and colors; I will describe them with all their qualities beginning with their characteristic signs." (Chapter 3/1 The Yavanajataka of Sphujidhvaja)

- "The rule concerning the actions of people which was described by the foremost (astrologers) of the Greeks with respect to the planetary week-days is to be established in a similar rule with respect to the hours (horai) which pass through the days" (Chapter 77/9 The Yavanajataka of Sphujidhvaja)

- "If the ascendant is an upacaya of his birth-ascendant and is occupied by a benefit planet, but not conjoined with a malefic, and if the Moon is in a good and favourable sign, the Greeks say that he always succeeds in his undertakings." (Chapter 78/3 The Yavanajataka of Sphujidhvaja)

- "The wise say that the observed course of the planets is the supreme eye of the entire body of the rules of horoscopy. I shall explain it concisely according to the instruction of the Greeks." (Chapter 79/1 The Yavanajataka of Sphujidhvaja)

- "Some who are students of the laws (of astronomy) find that it is good to follow the opinion of the sage Vasistha; (but according to) the best of the Greeks (the yuga) should consist of 165 years." (Chapter 79/3 The Yavanajataka of Sphujidhvaja)

== See also ==
- Indo-Greek kingdom
- Paulisa Siddhanta
- Romaka Siddhanta
