= Dinakara =

16th century Hindu astronomer

Dinakara (fl. 1550) was an astronomer from India who produced a treatise named the Candrārkī (consisting of 33 verses) dealing with the preparation of Indian calendars (pancanga) based on the movement of the sun and moon. The treatise exists in as many as 150 manuscript versions as well as with commentaries, some of which have been interpreted, translated and compared with modern approaches.

Dinakara is noted as the son of Rāmeśvara and greatgrandson of Dunda from the Moḍhajñāti family and at the time of writing his treatise was residing at Bārejya (which has been assumed to be Bariya in Rewa Kantha, Gujarat). His major works were astronomical tables made for Śaka 1500 (Sunday, April 9, 1578 CE) and Śaka 1505 (AD 1583). His treatise Kheṭakasiddhi (1578) contains rules for determining the positions of the five planets based on the Brahmatulya of Bhāskara II. The Candrārkī has tables on solar and lunar movement. His third work Tithisāraṇī (or Dinakarasāraṇī) (1583) covers the making of pancangas, the calculation of days, tithis, nakṣatras, and yogas, and was based partly on the earlier work Mahādevī of Mahādeva. Dinakara's work was an influence for Haridatta II's Jagadbhūṣaṇa (1638).

Achalajit of Muraripupura in Gurjaradesa wrote another Chandrarki (IAST: Candrārkī) in 1655, by converting Dinakara's work from the system followed by the brahma-paksha school to that of the saura-paksha school.
