= Mathuranatha Sarman =

17th century Bengali Hindu astronomer

Mathurānātha Śarman (fl. 1609) was an Indian calendrist and astronomer who lived in Bengal and belonged to the Saurapakṣa tradition of Indian astronomy. He is known from his work the Ravisiddhāntamañjarī or Sūryasiddhāntamañjarī, with planetary longitude tables and the means to compute solar eclipses. The Sanskrit manuscript of the Ravisiddhāntamañjarī was published in the Bibliotheca Indica series, work number 198, by the Royal Asiatic Society of Bengal. He may also have been the author of some other works including the Pañcaṅgaratna and the Praśnaratnāṅkura or Samayāmṛta.
