= Mahendra Sūri =

Indian mathematician (1340–1400)

Mahendra Sūri (c. 1340 – 1400) is the 14th century Jain astronomer who wrote the Yantraraja, the first Indian treatise on the astrolabe. He was trained by Madana Sūri, and was teacher to Malayendu Sūri. Jainism had a strong influence on mathematics particularly in the last couple of centuries BC. By the time of Mahendra Suri, however, Jainism had lost support as a national religion and was much less vigorous.

== Works ==
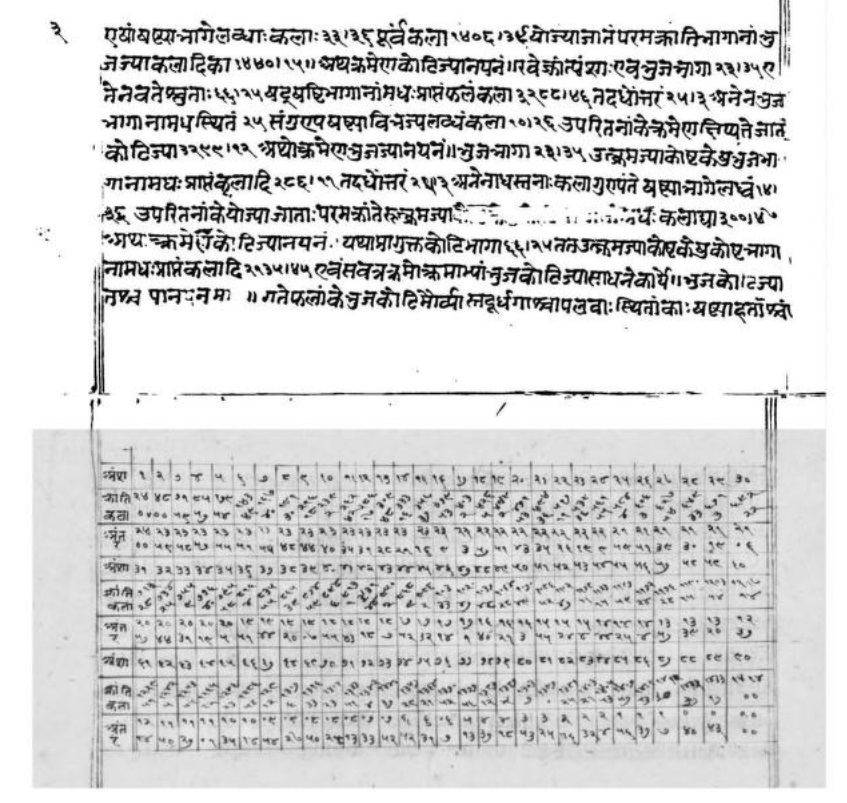
Image of folio 3 of Malayendu Sūri's commentary (1382) on Mahendra Sūri's Yantrarāja (1370). (Internet Archive)

Mahendra Suri's fame rests on the work Yantrarāja, which introduced the astrolabe to the Indian astronomer. Mahendra Sūri was patronized by the Tughluq ruler of Delhi, Firūz Shāh (r. 1351–1388), who evinced keen interest in astronomy. Firūz Shāh had earlier caused the Bṛhatsaṃhitā of Varāhamihira to be translated into Persian. At the sultan's instance, Mahendra Sūri studied the astrolabe and introduced it to the Sanskrit audience in 1370 in his Yantrarāja. Its circulation was largely, if not wholly, confined to astronomers who worked within the Islamic and Ptolemaic traditions.

The Yantrarāja is best described as an astrolabe user's manual. It explains how this king (rāja) of instruments (yantra) is to be constructed and commissioned for purposes of observation. The saumya yantra (northern instrument) projected from the South Pole and the yāmya yantra (southern instrument) projected from the North Pole are discussed separately, followed by a description of the phaṇīndra yantra (the serpentine instrument), which combines both.

A detailed discussion on the application of the astrolabe is found in Malayendu Sūri's commentary on the Yantrarāja. This commentary is also interesting because it provided, for the first time to Indian astronomers, tables for ready reference, which helped simplify calculations. The commentator gave latitudes of 75 cities. Malayendu made a list of latitudes for 32 stars, which were identified as relevant for purposes of calculations in India.

== See also ==
- Indian mathematicians
- Yantraraja

== Sources ==
- K. V. Sarma (2008), "Mahendra Suri", Encyclopaedia of the History of Science, Technology, and Medicine in Non-Western Cultures (2nd edition) edited by Helaine Selin, Springer, ISBN 978-1-4020-4559-2.
