= Vasishtha Siddhanta =

Astronomical system

Vasishtha Siddhanta is one of the earliest astronomical systems in use in India, which is summarized in Varahamihira's Pancha-siddhantika(6th century). It is attributed to sage Vasishtha and claims a date of composition of 1,299,101 BCE. The original text probably dated to the 4th century, but it has been lost and our knowledge of it is restricted to Varahamira's account. Alberuni ascribes the work to Vishnuchandra.

There is a modern work bearing the title Vasishtha Siddhantika.
