= Haridatta II =

Hindu astronomer from Mewar

Haridatta II (fl. 1638) was an astronomer from Mewar (present day Rajasthan) who is known for creating one of the first astronomical tables in India, known as the Jagadbhūṣaṇa, published in 1638.

Haridatta, the son of Haraji, lived during the reign of Jagatsiṃha I (1628–1652) of Mewar. Little is known about him other than from his published set of tables for identifying planetary positions by following the Brahmapaksha school of astronomy. It has been said that the earlier genre of algorithms coded in verse for the computation of planetary positions were replaced by the table-text format with this publication.
