= Daśabala =

Daśabala (fl. 1055 – 1058 ) was an astronomer who lived in Saurashtra in what is now Rajasthan and wrote several works on calendars, eclipses, and planetary conjunctions.

Daśabala lived in what is now Rajasthan and belonged to a Buddhist sect and called himself Bodhisattva. His father's name was Virocana and belonged to a clan called Valabha. He worked under the patronship of King Bhoja of the Paramara dynasty of Rajasthan. All that is known of Daśabala is from his two works, the Cintāmanṇisāraṇikā (1055) and the Karaṇakamalamārtaṇḍa (1058) which indicate his membership to the Brahma School of astronomy (or Brāhmapakṣa, 5th to 12th century). These texts include astronomical calculations in verse form. They provide means for calendar calculations, determining the positions of the planets, lunar and solar eclipses as well as a 60 year cycle of Jupiter.
