= Romaka Siddhanta =

Indian astronomical treatise

The Romaka Siddhanta (Sanskrit: रोमकसिद्धान्त, romanized: Romaka Siddhānta), literally "The Doctrine of the Romans", is one of the five siddhantas (doctrine or tradition) mentioned in Varahamihira's Panchasiddhantika which is an Indian astronomical treatise.

Romaka Siddhanta is based on the astronomical learning of the Byzantine Empire, also referred to as the Eastern Roman Empire.

== Content ==
It is the only one of all Indian astronomical works which is based on the tropical system. It was considered one of "The Five Astronomical Canons" in India in the 5th century.

== See also ==
- Paulisa Siddhanta
- Indian science and technology
- Indian mathematics
- Indian astronomy
