= Paulisa Siddhanta =

Hindu astronomical treatises

The Pauliṣa Siddhānta (literally, "The scientific-treatise of Pauliṣa Muni") refers to multiple Indian astronomical treatises, at least one of which is based on a Western source. "Siddhānta" literally means "doctrine" or "tradition".

It is often mistakenly thought to be a single work and attributed to Paul of Alexandria (c. 378 CE). However, this notion has been rejected by other scholars in the field, notably by David Pingree who stated that "...the identification of Paulus Alexandrinus with the author of the Pauliṣa Siddhānta is totally false". Similarly, K. V. Sarma writes that it is from a Greek source, known only as Pauliṣa.

Alberuni wrote that the Siddhanta is based on the teaching of a Greek named Paulus.

The earlier Pauliṣa-siddhānta dates from the third or fourth century, and the later Pauliṣa-siddhānta from the eighth century.

Similar to the Yavanajātaka ("The Sayings of the Greeks"), the Pauliṣa Siddhānta is an example of Hellenistic astronomy (especially the Alexandrian school) in India during the first centuries CE.

The Pauliṣa Siddhānta was particularly influential on the work of the Indian astronomer Varāhamihira. It was considered one of "The Five Astronomical Canons" in India in the 5th century.

== See also ==
- Hellenistic astrology
- Ptolemy
