= Vedanga Jyotisha =

Hindu text on astrology

Vedanga Jyotisha (IAST: Vedāṅga Jyotiṣa), or Jyotishavedanga (Jyotiṣavedāṅga), is one of earliest known Indian texts on astrology (Jyotisha). The extant text is dated to the final centuries BCE, but it may be based on a tradition reaching back to about 700-600 BCE. The Vedanga Jyotisha, is dated by some scholars to 1400–1200 BCE (with the extant form possibly from 700 to 600 BCE).

The text is foundational to Jyotisha, one of the six Vedanga disciplines. Its author is traditionally named as Lagadha.

== Textual history ==
The dating of the Vedanga Jyotisha is relevant for the dating of the Vedic texts. The Vedanga Jyotisha describes the winter solstice for the period of ca. 1400 BCE. This description has been used to date the Vedanga Jyotisha. According to Michael Witzel, the question is "whether the description as given in the Jyotisha is also the date of the text in which it is transmitted. It is written in two recensions – Rigveda recensions and Yajurveda recensions. Rigveda recensions and Yajurveda recensions have same verses except for eight additional verses in the Yajurveda's one". T. K. S. Sastry and R. Kochhar suppose that the Vedanga Jyotisha was written in the period that it describes, and therefore propose an early date, between 1370 and 1150 BCE. David Pingree dates the described solstice as about 1180 BCE, but notes that the relevance of this computation to the date of the Vedanga Jyotisha is not evident. The estimation of 1400-1200 BCE has been followed by others, with Subbarayappa adding that the extant form can possibly be from 700-600 BCE.

Other authors propose a later composition. Santanu Chakraverti writes that it has been composed after 700 BCE, while Michael Witzel dates it to the last centuries BCE, based on the style of composing. According to Chakraverti, its description of the winter solstice is correct for ca. 1400 BCE, but not for the time of its composition after 700 BCE. This may be due to the incorporation of late Harappan astronomical knowledge into the Vedic fold, an idea also proposed by Subbarayappa. Michael Witzel notes:

[O]nly if one is convinced that Lagadha intended the solstice to be exactly at alpha Delphini of Dhanishta, one can date his observations back to the late second millennium. Since that cannot be shown beyond doubt, since the composition of the text is in Late Epic language, and since its contents have clear resemblances to Babylonian works, the text must belong to a late period, to the last centuries BCE.

== Calendar ==
The calendar described by the Vedāṅga Jyotiṣa is based on the average motion of the Sun and Moon, but does not describe their precise movements. The calendar has a 5 year cyclical period called a yuga. The yuga begins on the 1st day of the month of Māgha when the Sun and Moon return together (a new moon day) at the Dhaniṣṭhā star (Beta Delphini) on the day of uttarāyaṇa (winter solstice). The starting conditions of a yuga were accurate when the calendar was first implemented, however in the following centuries corrections would have to be made in order for each yuga to maintain them. A yuga consists of 62 months of which 2 are intercalary (adhika māsa), with the intercalary months being added after every 30 months in the 3rd and 5th years in the form of an extra month before Śrāvaṇa and an extra month at the end of a year, respectively. A tithi is defined as being 1/30 of a lunar month, and each day was reckoned to have a tithi. However since there are more tithis in a yuga than civil days, a tithi is omitted every 61 days (kṣaya tithi). Also since the period of a tithi is slightly less than a civil day, and extra tithi would be added at the end of a yuga. Each day was also considered to belong at a nakṣatra (asterism) which the Moon occupied. However, the period of a nakṣatra is shorter than a civil day, thus an extra nakṣatra is added every 3,279 days. The months of the year are called Māgha, Phālguna, Caitra, Vaiśākha, Jyaiṣṭha, Āṣāḍha, (Śrāvaṇa Adhika, if needed), Śrāvaṇa, Bhādrapadā, Āśvina, Kārtika, Mārgaśīrṣa, Pauṣa, (Pauṣa or Māgha Adhika, if needed). The calendar follows the amānta system in which months end with amāvasyā (new moon) and begin on śukla pratipada.

== Editions ==
- Yajus recension, Rk variants and commentary of Somākara Śeṣanāga, edited: Albrecht Weber, Über den Vedakalender Namens Jyotisham, Berlin 1862
- Yajus recension, non-Yajus verses of Rk recension, edited: G. Thibaut, "Contributions to the Explanation of the Jyotisha-Vedánga", Journal of the Asiatic Society Bengal Vol 46 (1877), p. 411-437
- Hindi translation: Girja Shankar Shashtri, Jyotisha Karmkanda and Adhyatma Shodh Sansthan, 455 Vasuki Khurd, Daraganj, Allahabad-6.
- Sanskrit Commentary with Hindi Translation: Vedā̄ṅgajyotiṣam: Yajurvedināṃ paramparayāgatam vistr̥tasaṃskr̥tabhūmikayā. On Vedic astrology and astronomy; critical edited text with Hindi and Sanskrit commentaries. With appendies including Vedic calendar as described by Lagadha for his time. By Lagadha, Ācārya-Śivarāja Kauṇḍinnyāyana, Pramodavardhana Kaundinnyayana, Sammodavardhana Kauṇḍinnyāyana, Somākara

== Sources ==
- Chakraverti, Santanu (2007), Science in History. In: Jyoti Bhusan Das Gupta (ed.), "Science, Technology, Imperialism, and War", Pearson Education India
- Klostermaier, Klaus (2010), A Survey of Hinduism (Third ed.), SUNY, ISBN 978-0-7914-8011-3
- Subbarayappa, B.V. (1989). "Indian astronomy: a historical perspective". In Biswas, S. K.; Mallik, D. C. V.; Vishveshwara, C. V. (eds.). Cosmic Perspectives. Cambridge University Press. ISBN 978-0-521-34354-1.
- Witzel, Michael (25 May 2001). "Autochthonous Aryans? The Evidence from Old Indian and Iranian Texts". Electronic Journal of Vedic Studies. 7 (3).
