= David Pingree =

American mathematics historian (1933–2005)

David Edwin Pingree
- Born: January 2, 1933; New Haven, Connecticut, U.S.
- Died: November 11, 2005 (aged 72); Providence, Rhode Island, U.S.

Academic work
- Discipline: History of Science
- Institutions: Brown University; Cornell University

David Edwin Pingree (January 2, 1933 – November 11, 2005) was an American historian of mathematics in the ancient world. He was a University Professor and Professor of History of Mathematics and Classics at Brown University.

== Life ==
Pingree graduated from Phillips Academy in Andover, Massachusetts, in 1950. He studied at Harvard University, where he earned his doctorate in 1960 with a dissertation on the supposed transmission of Hellenistic astrology to India. His dissertation was supervised by Daniel Henry Holmes Ingalls, Sr. and Otto Eduard Neugebauer. After completing his PhD, Pingree remained at Harvard for three more years as a member of its Society of Fellows before moving to the University of Chicago to accept the position of Research Associate at the Oriental Institute.

He joined the History of Mathematics Department at Brown University in 1971, eventually holding the chair until his death.

As successor to Otto Neugebauer in Brown's History of Mathematics Department (which Neugebauer established in 1947), Pingree numbered among his colleagues men of extraordinary learning, including Abraham Sachs and Gerald Toomer.

== Career ==
Jon McGinnis of the University of Missouri, St. Louis, describes Pingree's life-work thus:

... Pingree devoted himself to the study of the exact sciences, such as mathematics, mathematical astronomy and astral omens. He was also acutely interested in the transmission of those sciences across cultural and linguistic boundaries. His interest in the transmission of the exact sciences came from two fronts or, perhaps more correctly, his interest represents two sides of the same coin. On the one hand, he was concerned with how one culture might appropriate, and so alter, the science of another (earlier) culture in order to make that earlier scientific knowledge more accessible to the recipient culture. On the other hand, Pingree was also interested in how scientific texts surviving from a later culture might be used to reconstruct or cast light on our fragmentary records of earlier sciences. In this quest, Pingree would, with equal facility use ancient Greek works to clarify Babylonian texts on divination, turn to Arabic treatises to illuminate early Greek astronomical and astrological texts, seek Sanskrit texts to explain Arabic astronomy, or track the appearance of Indian astronomy in medieval Europe.

In June 2007, the Brown University Library acquired Pingree's personal collection of scholarly materials. The collection focuses on the study of mathematics and exact sciences in the ancient world, especially India, and the relationship of Eastern mathematics to the development of mathematics and related disciplines in the West. The collection contains some 22,000 volumes, 700 fascicles, and a number of manuscripts. The holdings consist of both antiquarian and recent materials published in Sanskrit, Arabic, Hindi, Persian and Western languages.

== Awards ==
Recipient of a Guggenheim Fellowship in 1975 and a MacArthur Fellowship in 1981, he was a member of the Society of Fellows at Harvard, the American Philosophical Society, and the Institute for Advanced Study; he was also A.D. White Professor-at-Large at Cornell University from 1995.

== Selected works ==
- 1968: Albumasaris de revolutionibus nativitatum (Teubner, Leipzig).
- 1970: Census of the Exact Sciences in Sanskrit (5 volumes) American Philosophical Society, Philadelphia.
- 1973: Hephaestionis Thebani Apotelesmaticorum libri III (vol. I; Teubner, Leipzig).
- 1974: Hephaestionis Thebani Apotelesmaticorum epitomae IV (vol. II; Teubner, Leipzig).
- 1976: Dorothei Sidonii carmen astrologicum (Teubner, Leipzig).
- 1978: The Yavanajātaka of Sphujidhvaja (2 volumes) (Harvard Oriental Series 48).
- 1986: Vettii Valentis Antiocheni Anthologiarum Libri IX (Teubner, Leipzig).
- 1997: (edited with Charles Burnett) The Liber Aristotilis of Hugo of Santalla (Warburg Institute Surveys and Texts 26, London).
- 2002: (with Takanori Kusuba) Arabic Astronomy in Sanskrit: Al-Birjandī on Tadhkira II, Chapter 11 and its Sanskrit Translation (Brill, Leiden).
- 2005: (with Erica Reiner) Babylonian Planetary Omens (Brill, Leiden).
- 2007: Rhetorius qui dictur: Compendium astrologicum: Libri Vi et VI (Berlin, Walter de Gruyter).
- See the Worldcat listing for further titles.

Articles in dictionaries and encyclopedias

- Pingree D., Brunner C. J. Astrology and astronomy in Iran // Encyclopædia Iranica
- Astrology // Britannica
- Astrology // The Dictionary of the History of Ideas (1973–74)

== Sources and external links ==
- Memorial by Kim Plofker and Bernard R. Goldstein in Aestimatio (http://www.ircps.org/aestimatio/2/70-71)
- Memorial by Toke Lindegaard Knudsen in the Bulletin of the Canadian Society for History and Philosophy of Mathematics https://web.archive.org/web/20070927032441/http://faculty.umf.maine.edu/~molinsky/cshpm/Bulletin/38-2006.pdf (pp. 5–6)
- Death notice in the Brown Daily Herald https://web.archive.org/web/20070929104430/http://www.browndailyherald.com/home/index.cfm?event=displayArticle&uStory_id=47d666ba-15db-402b-bd71-a539c61b03c5
- "An Indiana Jones of Mathematics" in the George Street Journal https://web.archive.org/web/20080516054525/http://www.brown.edu/Administration/George_Street_Journal/Pingree.html
- A collection of PDFs of some texts used by Dr. Pingree and his students, including a copy of a Heiberg edition of the Almagest used by Dr. Pingree himself: http://www.wilbourhall.org
