= Patronage in astronomy =

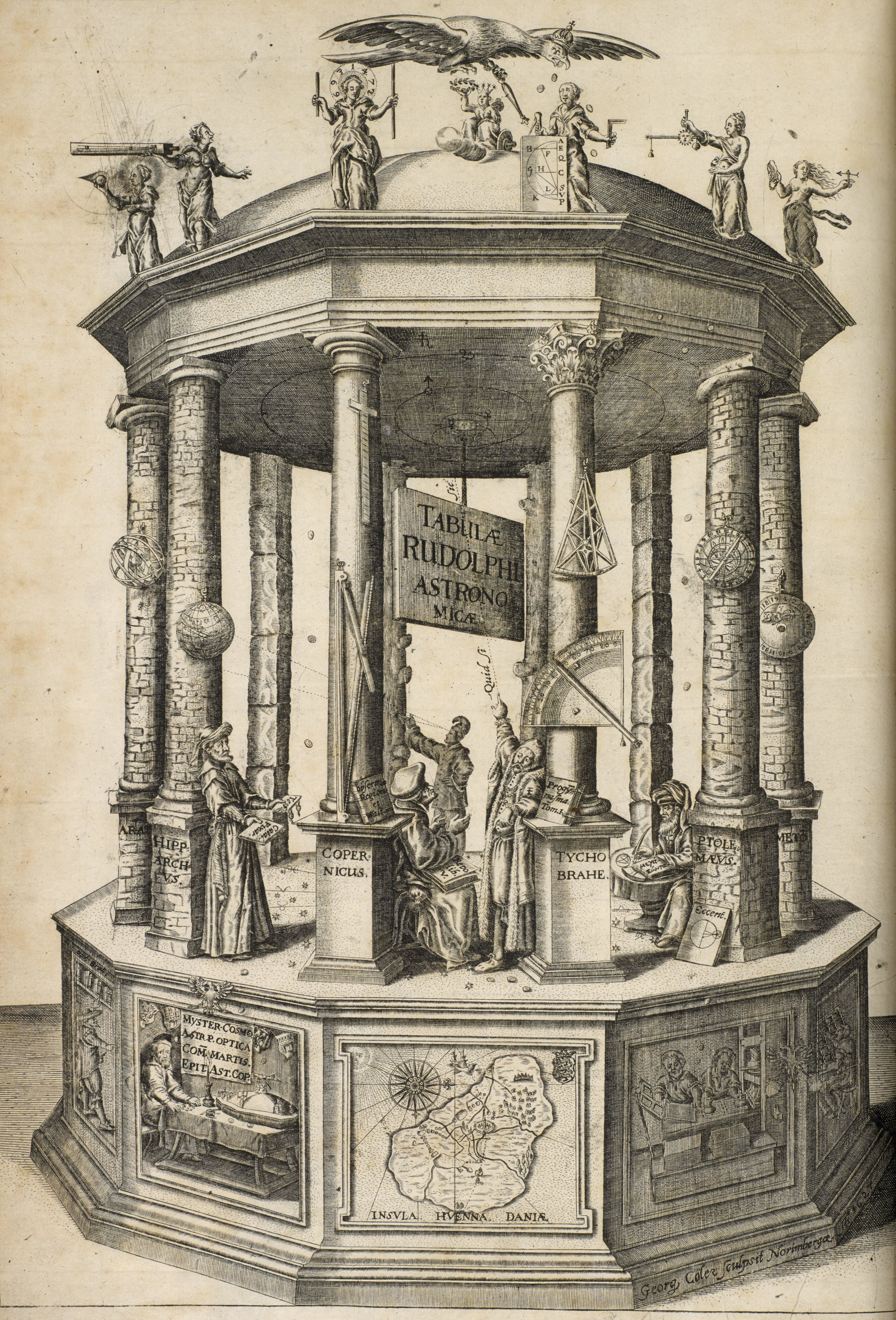
Frontispiece of the Rudolphine Tables

Patronage in astronomy is an approach which one can use to examine the history of astronomy from a cultural standpoint. Rather than simply focusing on the findings and discoveries of individual astronomers, this approach emphasizes the importance of patronage in shaping the field of astronomy.

== Importance to the history of science ==
An often overlooked dimension in the history of science, the patronage system and the realities that existed within such a system played an important role in the lives of many of science's icons and heroes. The history of astronomy in particular is filled with examples demonstrating the relationship between patron and client, including that of Galileo Galilei and his ties to the Medici family. Many historians have begun to examine the importance of examining scientific history through this relatively forgotten lens. Dr. Robert Smith, in an article examining patronage in the early history of NASA, begins with the assertion that “the history of space astronomy is usually written from the perspective of the remarkable scientific findings garnered by space astronomers and the ways these findings have enriched and guided new views of the universe.” But, as Barker and Goldstein ensure, “following the groundbreaking work of Robert Westman and Richard S. Westfall, historians of astronomy and historians of science in general have come to appreciate the importance of patronage in understanding the development of science during the sixteenth and seventeenth centuries.” As crucial as the many developments and findings of science's heroes are to the historiography of science, many historians, like Nicholas Jardine, Mario Biagioli, Richard Westfall and others, have sought to bring to light the issues of patronage within this discourse, and their works have looked to enrich the understandings of many of science's heroes, including Galileo Galilei, Johannes Kepler, and Tycho Brahe amongst others. Patronage cannot provide the lone solution to understanding the social history of the Scientific Revolution, as some figures in the movement “were not sustained by patronage, and it is not yet clear how many were so supported.” Despite this, patronage “was perhaps the most pervasive institution of preindustrial society.” Richard Westfall concludes:

Only now are scholars beginning to chart its course in the science of the age, and we have every reason to expect that it will prove to be very important there as well. I would like to suggest, that patronage, together with other practices that the age itself reveals to us, may be the avenue most likely to lead us into a fruitful social history of the Scientific Revolution, a movement to which the present generation of scholars has devoted itself extensively. In our investigations, it appears to me, we have allowed ourselves to be dominated excessively by concepts derived in the nineteenth century which are more applicable to that century and our own than to [the] [seventeenth] [century]... Efforts to impose them on the 17th century have appeared forced and largely barren, and I want to propose, not as a new dogmatism, but as a topic for discussion, the possibility that we need to come at the problem from a different angle, using seventeenth-century categories instead of nineteenth-century ones. Patronage was certainly a seventeenth-century category.

== What is patronage? ==
The system of patronage in 16th- and early 17th-century astronomy was different from the modern definition of patronage. The system of patronage, in the context of Astronomers such as Galileo, Kepler, and Copernicus, was a complex system of relations held between such astronomers and other individuals of high social standing.

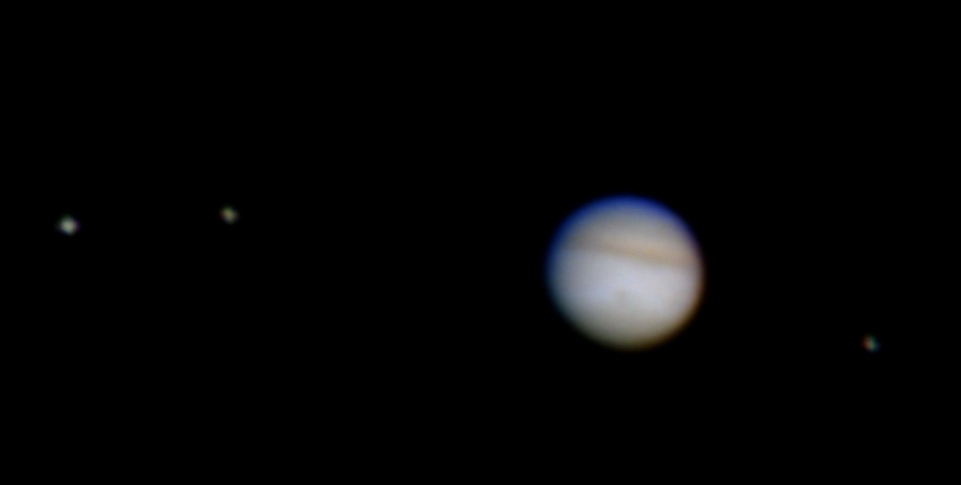
Jupiter's moons shown from an amateur telescope

These relations allowed for the likes of Galileo to hold positions under such powerful people as the Medici family, granting him not only increased social status due to his relations with such high social ranks, but entry into these positions also allowed for the time and monies to work on scientific endeavors. As important as these relationships were for patrons such as Galileo, for reasons of gaining monies and higher social status, clients also found importance in patronage from the reciprocal nature of the relationship. Gifts to be bestowed upon clients, such as the Medici Stars given to the Medici family by Galileo (he named Jupiter's moons after the family upon his discovery of them) gave increased social splendor and honor to the recipients of such extravagance and rarity.

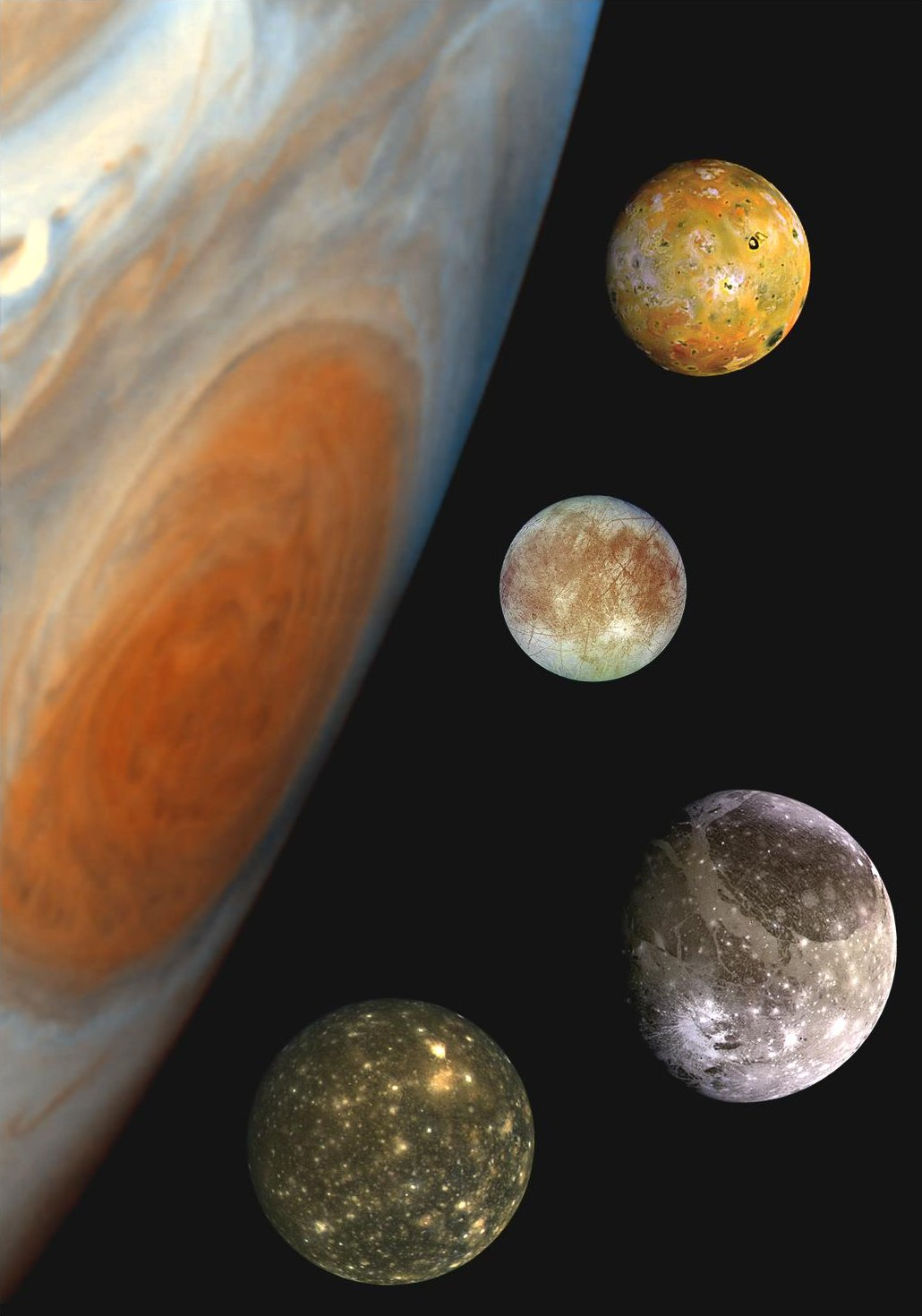
Modern day photo of the Moons of Jupiter, which Galileo named the Medici Stars upon discovery

The courts where these patronage relationships played out would also contribute to the “cognitive legitimation of the new science by providing venues for the social legitimation of its practitioners, and this, in turn, boosted the epistemological status of their discipline.” Although Patronage can be explained as a system of social connections and relationships amongst social elite and practitioners of what we now umbrella under the term science, it was actually a “set of dyadic relations between patrons and clients, each of them unique… [having] no institutions and little if any formal structure. Patronage embodied no guarantees, and the “relation between patron and client was voluntary on both sides and subject always to disintegration” where past “performance counted only to the extent that it promised more in the future.” Westfall notes a “client's only claim on a patron was his capacity to illuminate further the magnificence of the man who recognized his value and encouraged him.”

== Viewpoint of historians ==
=== Nicholas Jardine ===
In his article titled The Places of Astronomy in Early-Modern Culture, Nicholas Jardine looks to examine how the system of patronage and the codes of courtly conduct shaped a new agenda for astronomy: the quest for the true world system. Jardine begins his article by noting that astronomy “did not then make up a specialty or discipline in anything like the modern sense… rather, it comprised a whole series of practices widely diffused through the various social sites and strata.” The focus of University teachings on astronomy was “predominantly practical and utilitarian, directed towards the calendrical, navigational, agricultural, and above all, medical applications of the subject… [p]lanetary models were on the whole considered as fictions devised for predictive purposes.” But, during the course of the sixteenth century “there arose an entirely new kind of princely and aristocratic involvement in astronomy, an involvement in which astronomical observations, instruments, models, and ultimately world systems themselves became objects of courtly production, exchange, and competition.” Some notable places of this “new courtly culture of astronomy were the court of Landgraf Wilhelm IV of Hesse-Kassel, Tycho Brahe’s island of Hven (held in fief from Frederick II of Denmark) and, some decades later, Rudo III’s imperial court at Prague, the Medici court and the papal court.” By the later decades of the sixteenth century, in these places, as a consequence of astronomers utilizing the patronage system, a fair number of astronomers found themselves dining at princely tables “rather than seated below the salt at university feasts.” Jardine divides the main sites of astronomy into university, court and city, and notes aspects of University such as appointments and curricula as “very often under direct or indirect court control: Wilhelm IV of Hesse-Kassel, for example, closely supervised appointments and the curriculum at his father’s new university of Marburg… [a]nd conversely, court mathematical appointments were often held concurrently with university posts or filled on university nomination.” Further, Jardine argues that at “least in the court context, the model of stable, salary-based patron-client relationships is inappropriate… [r]ather, power and dependence arose out of mechanism of mutual recognition of status and honour, regulated by exchange of gifts, tokens, and services.” He notes that in “such an ‘economy of honour’, princes often competed to secure the service of notable astronomers; and they, in turn, played patrons off against each other as they shifted and multiplied their allegiances... [in] [other] [words] patrons and clients collected and displayed each other. Jardine observes how recent authors have noted ways in which the new cosmologies of the sixteenth century embodied courtly ideals. For example, “in his De rebus coelestibus of 1512 Giovanni Gioviano Pontano, secretary and ambrassador of the Aragonese rulers of Naples, projected into the heavens a court society, in which the planets dance to the tunes of their master, the Sun; much like how that at the Neapolitan court, as at many other European courts, the courtiers danced before their ruler on ceremonial occasions.” Not merely the “forms of the new cosmologies, but the very quest for a true world system was”, Jardine believes, “a product of courtly ethos.” He recalls that many recent historians “have emphasized the constitutive roles of gift exchange in the sixteenth-century court… [where] [g]ifts were displayed as symbolic representations of power and as object of erudite, often playful conversation- that is, in a somewhat later idiom, as ‘conversation pieces’.” Often it was through the presentation of instruments, gift-books, and “discoveries in the case of astronomy- that positions of service at court were solicited and secured.” Patronage relationships often helped both parties achieve social distinction, maintaining honor and mutual distinction, even after death; for example:

in 1592 Hieronymus Treutler, Professor of Law at the University of Marburg, delivered a funeral oration for Wilhelm IV of Hesse-Kassel. At the end of the oration Treutler turn[ed] to the Landgraf’s astronomical activities… prais[ing] him as a skilled practitioner and celebrat[ing] him as a patron who ha[d] emulated those great examples Julius Ceaser, patron of Sosigene’s reform of the calendar, and Alfonso the Wise. He [told] how the Landgraf’s clockmaker, Jost Bürgi, made a wonderful gilded globe, “which in accordance with the most exact observations exactly represented the motions not only of the planets, but of the entire firmament”. The Emperor Rudolf heard of the globe and requested that it and its maker be sent to him. “It is wonderful to relate”, declare[d] Treutler, “what pleasure this gave our Prince.” In return, the Emperor sent a personal thank-you letter, received just before the Landgraf’s death.

The Tychonian system

Jardine notes that this “honourable exchange of tokens figures in the oration as the culmination of the Landgraf’s life. Jardine also highlights a dispute between Tycho Brahe and Ursus where Ursus was accused of stealing a diagram of Tycho’s planetary ordering while at Hven. Tycho eventually brought in the help of Kepler, who wrote a detailed defence of Tycho’s claims to priority Jardine contends that “in the course of these challenges and counter challenges Tycho and Kepler had redefined the object of the dispute in Tycho’s favour… [t]he claim to priority in the construction of a world system was not the starting point of this courtly duel, but its end-product… [being] so to speak, the final challenge.” Upon recognition of these events, and looking through this interpretation, it seems “the very setting of the world system- a complete physically grounded model of the cosmos—as the goal of astronomy was a product of the competitive practices of courtly exchange of gifts and novelties.” In conclusion, Jardine points that early modern astronomy was formed by its cultural settings, settings in which patronage played a significant part. Further, he suggests that the “courtly patronage of astronomy generated a new agenda for astronomy—specifically, the quest for the true and complete world system.”

=== Mario Biagioli ===
In his book, Galileo Courtier: The Practice of Science in the Culture of Absolutism, Mario Biagioli looks to shed light on the ways in which a society characterized by patronage relationships affected one of astronomy's, and modern science's, greatest heroes: Galileo Galilei. Biagioli looks to uncover aspects of Galileo's life by “vividly [presenting] the pioneer physicist to us through the active social relations he experienced with persons in the different courts with which he was connected.”

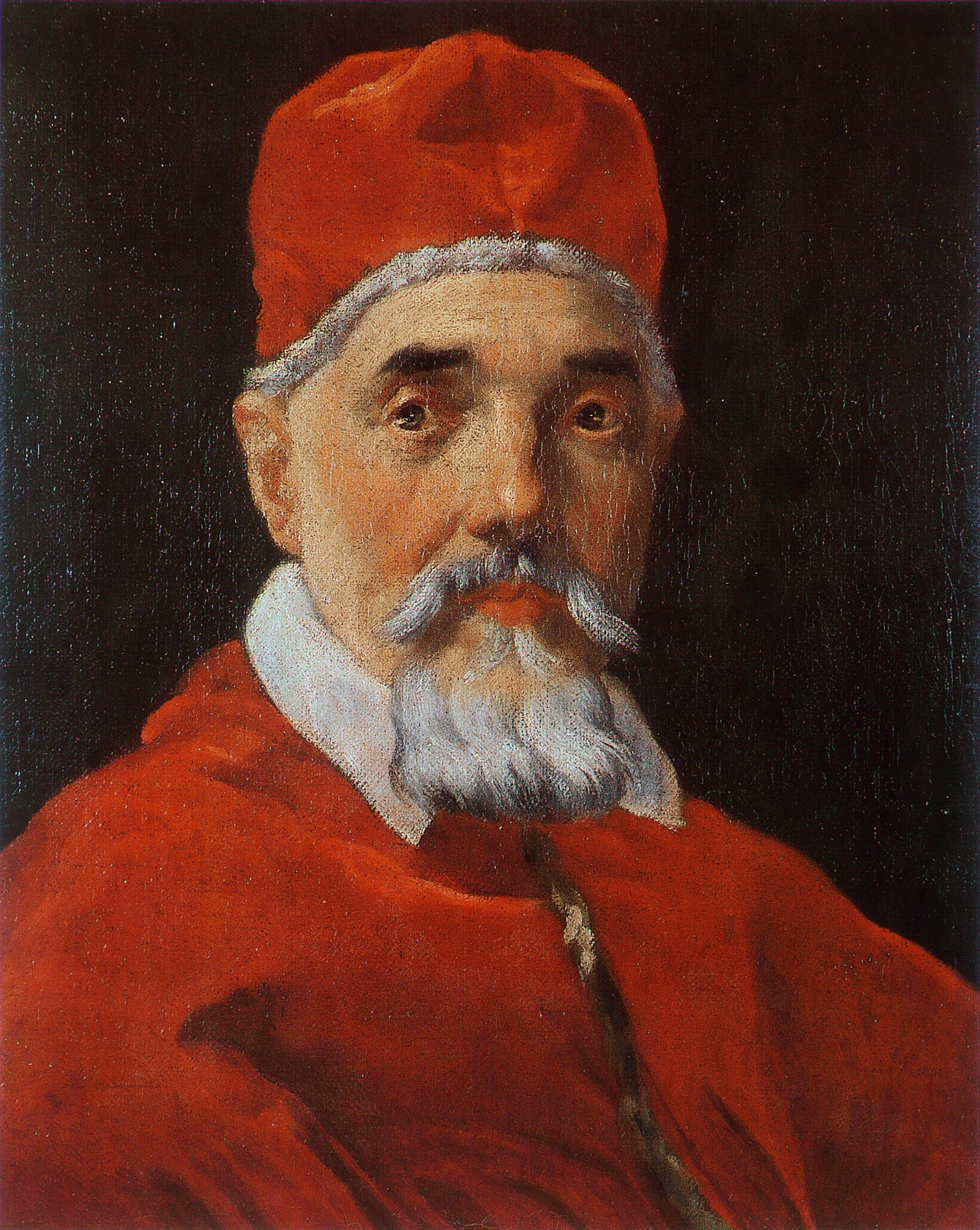
Pope Urban VIII

The book reveals how Galileo “used patronage to obtain his teaching position in Pisa… [and] maneuvered his transfer from Padua to the “home court” of the Medicis... used contacts with Prince Cesi and other well-placed persons in Roman circles to become an Academian, and a person of influence, and how all of this turned to dust for Galileo, when he lost the patronage of Urban VIII, one of his two most special patrons”. In a review of Biagioli's work, Larry Wolff noted Biagioli as demonstrating Galileo's legitimacy as a direct consequence of “his ‘career strategies’” and not just “his ‘cognitive attitudes’” and that Galileo is shown to be a master of attaining power and a seventeenth-century career in science The book acknowledges that “gifts within the logic of patronage [explain] the role of spectacular scientific production in Galileo’s career… [in that he] needed to produce or discover things that could be used as gifts for his patrons” Jardine adds, as Biagioli has shown, Galileo's gift to Cosimo II of his discovery of the satellites of Jupiter, transformed into emblems of Medici dynastic power, was a spectacularly successful instance. Through exchange of gifts, highly ritualized and often highly competitive, princes and nobles achieved social distinction, maintaining their honour and mutual recognition.

=== Robert Westman ===
Westman has observed “how in the preface to his De revolutionibus Copernicus appealed to Pope Paul III in a courtly, or rather curial, humanist language of clerical reform- promoting his new ordering of the planets as a restoration of lost order and harmony, and as a basis for the repair of the derelict calendar.” Westman's “reading is strongly confirmed by the dedication to Paul III of another new ordering of the planetary motions, Fracastoro’s Homocentrica, in which the strategies of appeal to the humanist Pope are closely similar.”

=== Richard S. Westfall ===
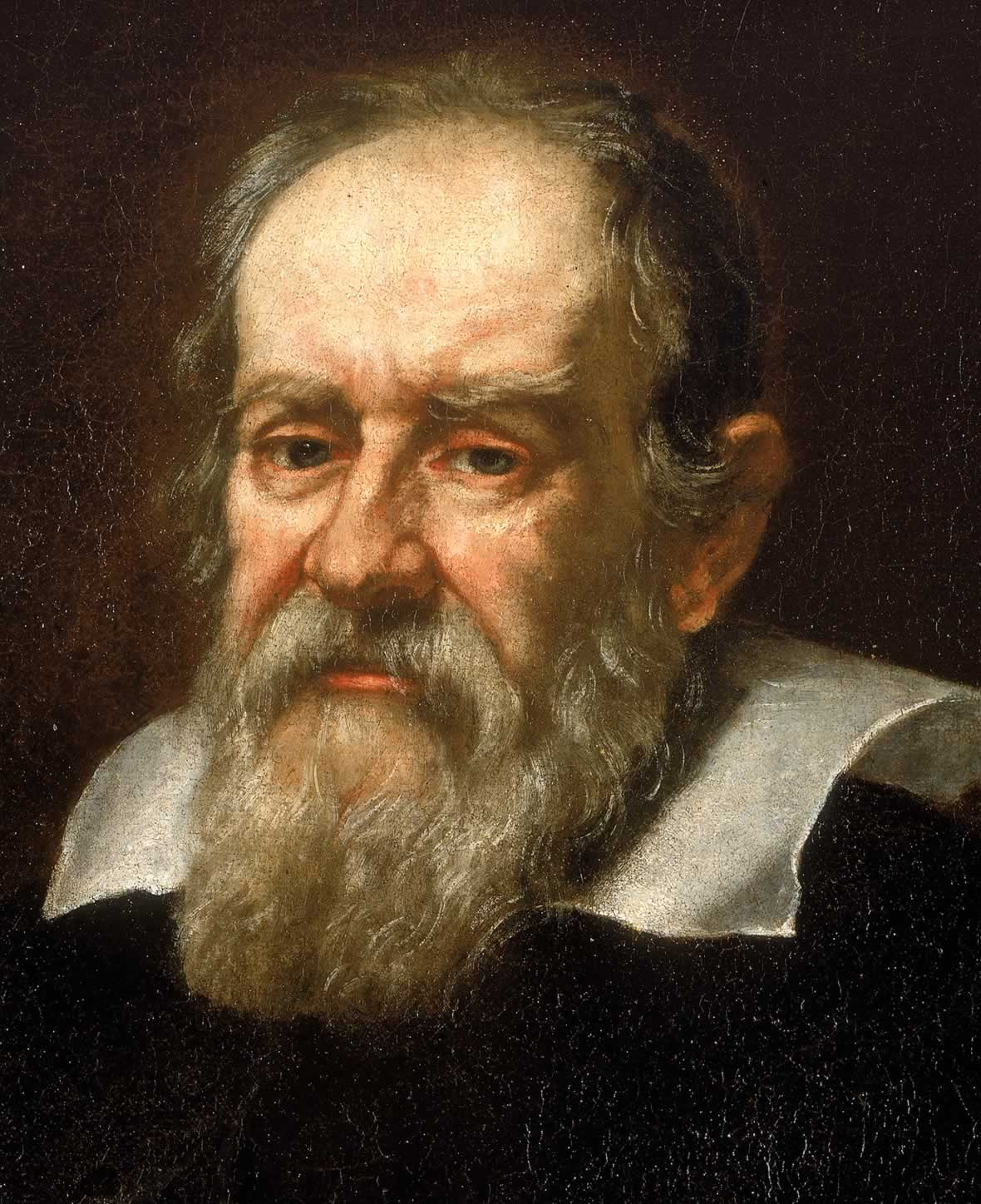
Galileo Galilei

Westfall notes that, in the early modern period, the “word 'friend' carries special connotations within a context of patronage; authorities on patronage distinguish what they call instrumental friendship from emotional friendship… [for] [example] Galileo's "friends" in Venice appear to have understood that the "friendship" entailed the use of their connections and influence on his behalf. In all of Galileo's attempts to rise up the ladder of Patronage, one of his connections, Sagredo, would write him words that Westfall considers “[o]ne would be hard pressed to find a better example of the language of patronage.” Westfall writes, “Sagredo, who was clearly tiring of the exercise, wanted to be sure that Galileo understood he had fulfilled his duty as a patron [in] [writing] ‘Since I have already satisfied abundantly enough the friendship I hold for you, the obligations to you which I acknowledge, and the favor and help that true gentlemen try to extend to the qualified who deserve it,’ he thought he might now honorably desist.” Westfall also provides fantastic evidence directly from the mouth of Galileo as to the importance of Patronage to himself and his scientific endeavors:

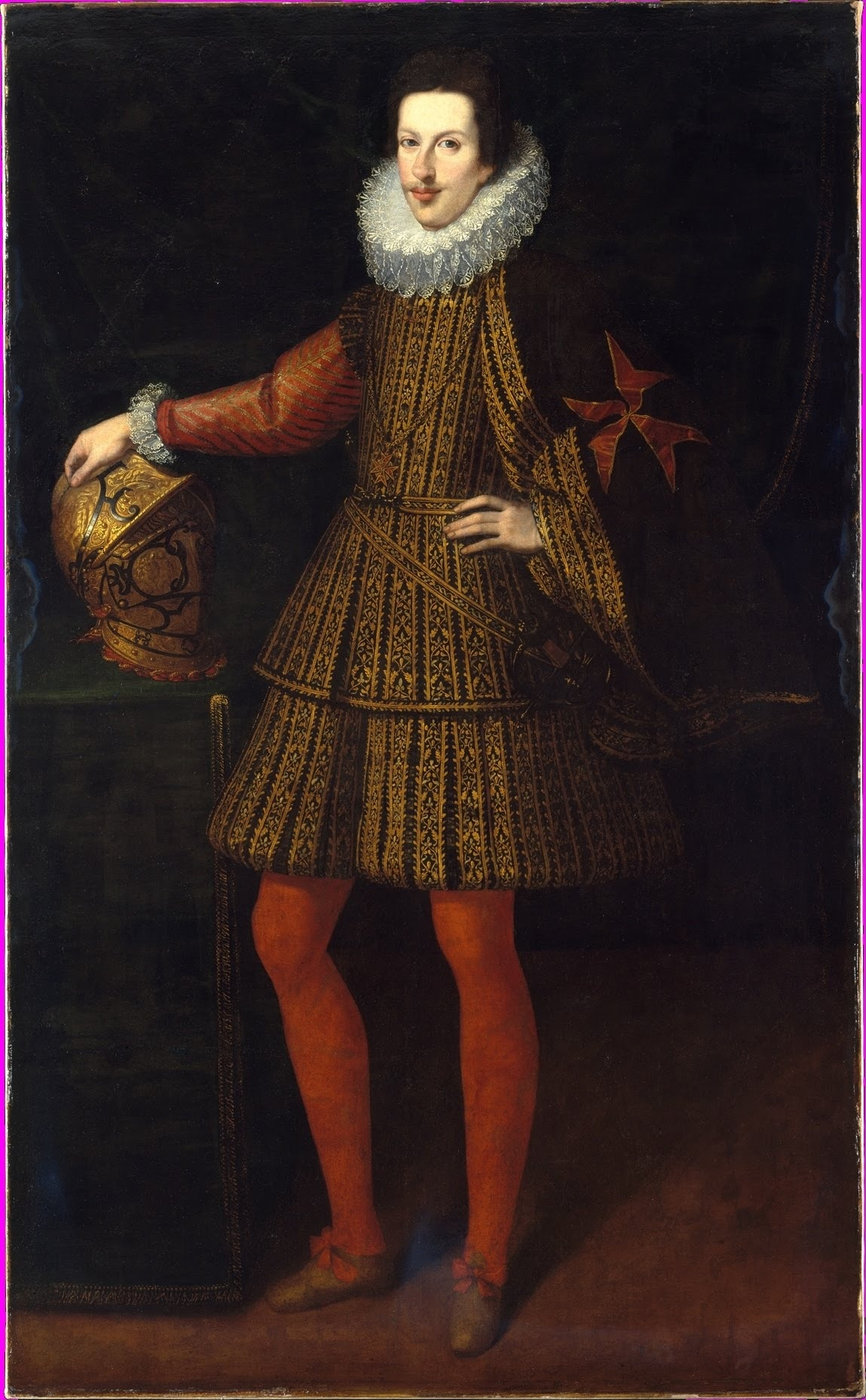
Cosimo II de' Medici, Grand Duke of Tuscany

"Having labored now twenty years, the best ones of my life, in dispensing at retail, as the saying goes, at the demand of everyone, that little talent in my profession that God and my own efforts have given me, my desires would truly be to obtain enough leisure and quiet as would enable me before I die to complete three great works that I have in hand in order to be able to publish them, perhaps with some praise for me and for whoever has helped me in the business. ... It is not possible to receive a salary from a Republic, however splendid and generous, without serving the public, because to get something from the public one must satisfy it and not just one particular person; and while I remain able to teach and to serve, no one can exempt me from the burden while leaving me the income; and in sum I cannot hope for such a benefit from anyone but an absolute prince."

Westfall describes that Galileo, upon discovering Jupiter’s moons, made sure to tantalize the Grand Duke of Tuscany, the position now held by Cosimo of the Medici family, with the honour of being attributed the award of such a discovery by means of them being named after him. As Westfall describes, “Galileo was sure he had found what he wanted, a ticket to Florence.” Westfall describes that “[i]n a word, Galileo had raised himself with one inspired blow from the level of an obscure professor of mathematics at the University of Padua to the status of the most desirable client in Italy.” Following the discovery of the Jupiter's moons, Galileo would then look to discover their periods; due to ensuing competition and even some minimizing the importance of only discovering the moons without knowledge of their period, Galileo's “acknowledged position as the messenger from the heavens was threatened”. Westfall also contends that evidence of Galileo's patterns of observing the sky suggest that “at the time Galileo began his celestial observations, he had not formulated a program of systematic observations designed to settle the Copernican issue.” Rather, Westfall asserts:

[H]e saw the telescope more as an instrument of patronage than as an instrument of astronomy. When Galileo, having seized what the moon and stars could quickly offer, had turned his telescope on the next brightest object in the evening sky, Jupiter, early in January, Venus was visible in the predawn sky. For a Copernican, Venus was in a critical part of its orbit, past maximum elongation, approaching superior conjunction, and thus exhibiting a shape incompatible with the Ptolemaic system. As we have seen, however, Jupiter had offered something quite different, an incomparable present to the grand duke, and Galileo had not paused to look further.

Westfall questions Galileo's commitment to Copernicanism, and instead views Galileo as being more concerned with finding discoveries that could help further his patronage relationship, and that Galileo was prepared to try to monopolize the telescope in order to do so.

== See also ==
- History of Science
- History of Astronomy
- Age of Enlightenment
- Galileo Galilei
- Galileo Affair
- Johannes Kepler
- Tycho Brahe
- Nicolaus Copernicus
