= History of astronomy =

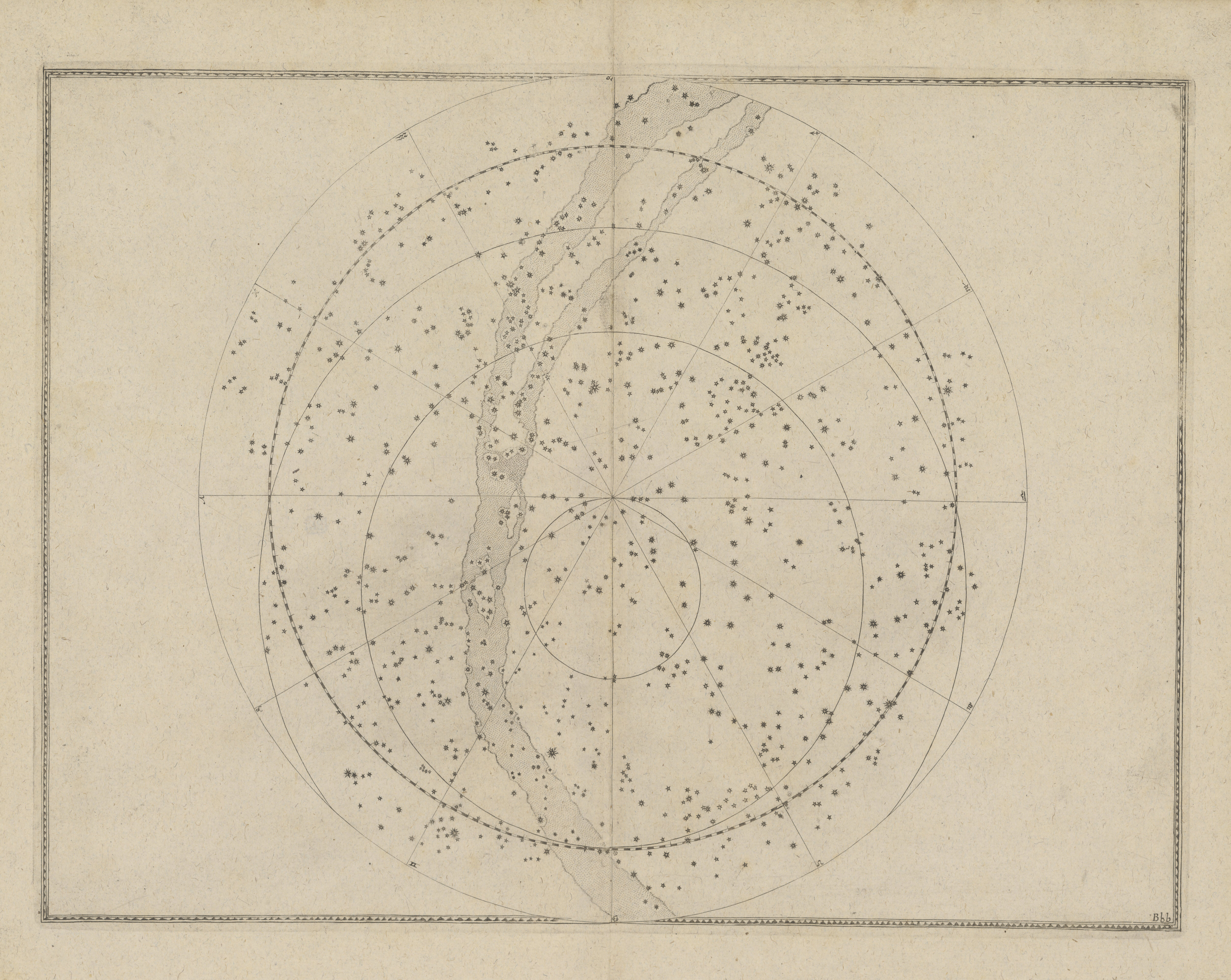
A map of the northern celestial hemisphere from Johann Bayer's 1661 edition of Uranometria, the first atlas to feature star charts covering the entire celestial sphere

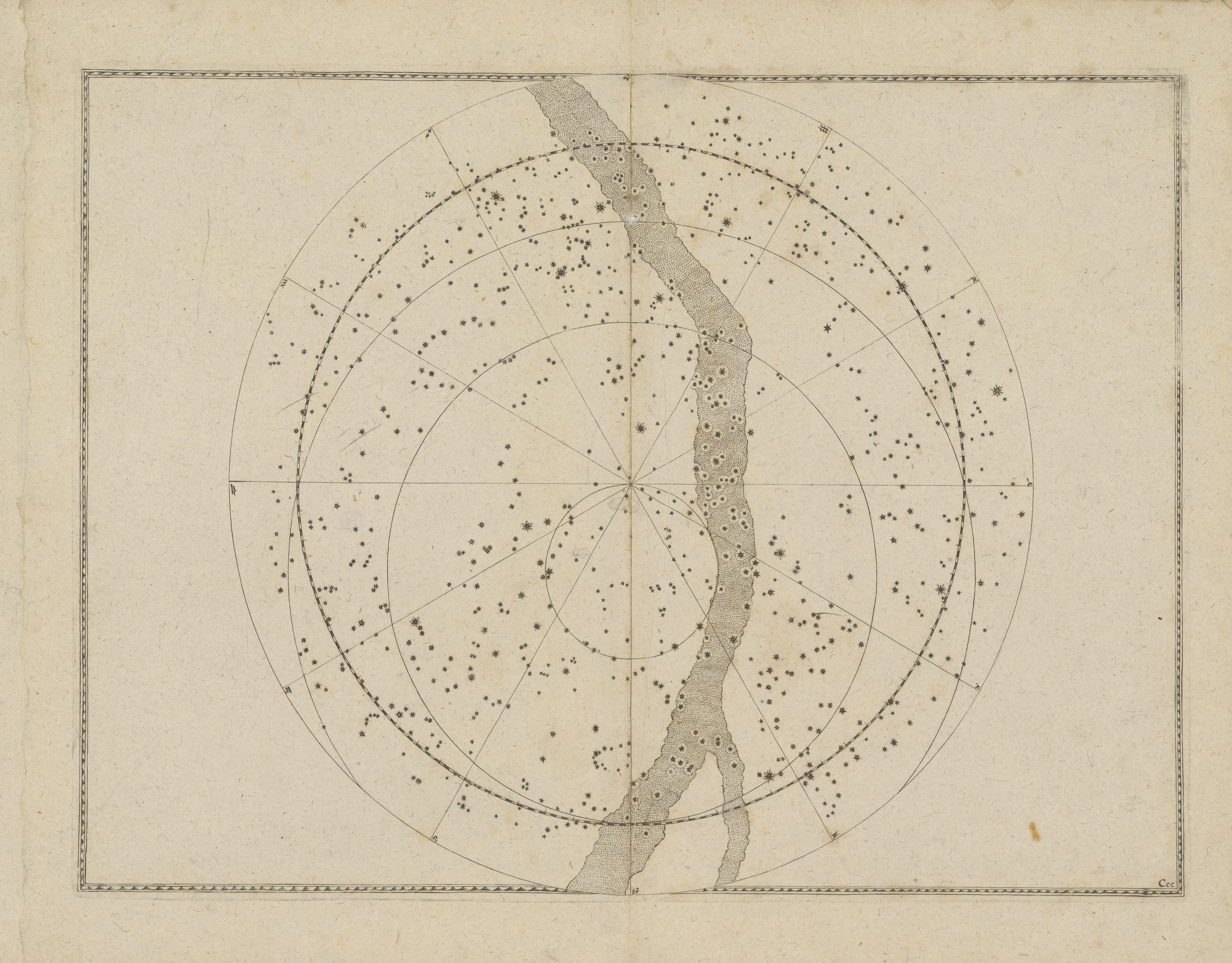
A map of the southern celestial hemisphere, also by Bayer

The history of astronomy focuses on the efforts of civilizations to understand the universe beyond earth's atmosphere. Astronomy is one of the oldest natural sciences, achieving a high level of success in the second half of the first millennium. Astronomy has origins in the religious, mythological, cosmological, calendrical, and astrological beliefs and practices of prehistory. Early astronomical records date back to the Babylonians around 1000 BC. There is also astronomical evidence of interest from early Chinese, Central American and North European cultures.

Astronomy was used by early cultures for timekeeping, navigation, spiritual and religious practices, and agricultural planning. Ancient astronomers observed and charted the skies in an effort to learn about the workings of the universe. During the Renaissance Period, revolutionary ideas emerged about astronomy. One such idea was contributed in 1543 by Polish astronomer Nicolaus Copernicus, who developed a heliocentric model that depicted the planets orbiting the Sun. This was the start of the Copernican Revolution, with the invention of the telescope in 1608 playing a key part. Later developments included the reflecting telescope, astronomical photography, astronomical spectroscopy, radio telescopes, cosmic ray astronomy, infrared telescopes, space telescopes, ultraviolet astronomy, X-ray astronomy, gamma-ray astronomy, space probes, neutrino astronomy, and gravitational-wave astronomy.

The success of astronomy, compared to other sciences, was achieved for several reasons. Astronomy was the first science to have a mathematical foundation. Standardized measuring instruments such as armillary spheres and quadrants provided a solid base for collecting, verifying and communicating data. Throughout the years, astronomy has broadened into multiple subfields such as astrometry, planetary astronomy, astrophysics, astrochemistry, astrobiology, stellar astronomy, galactic astronomy, extragalactic astronomy, and physical cosmology

== Prehistory ==
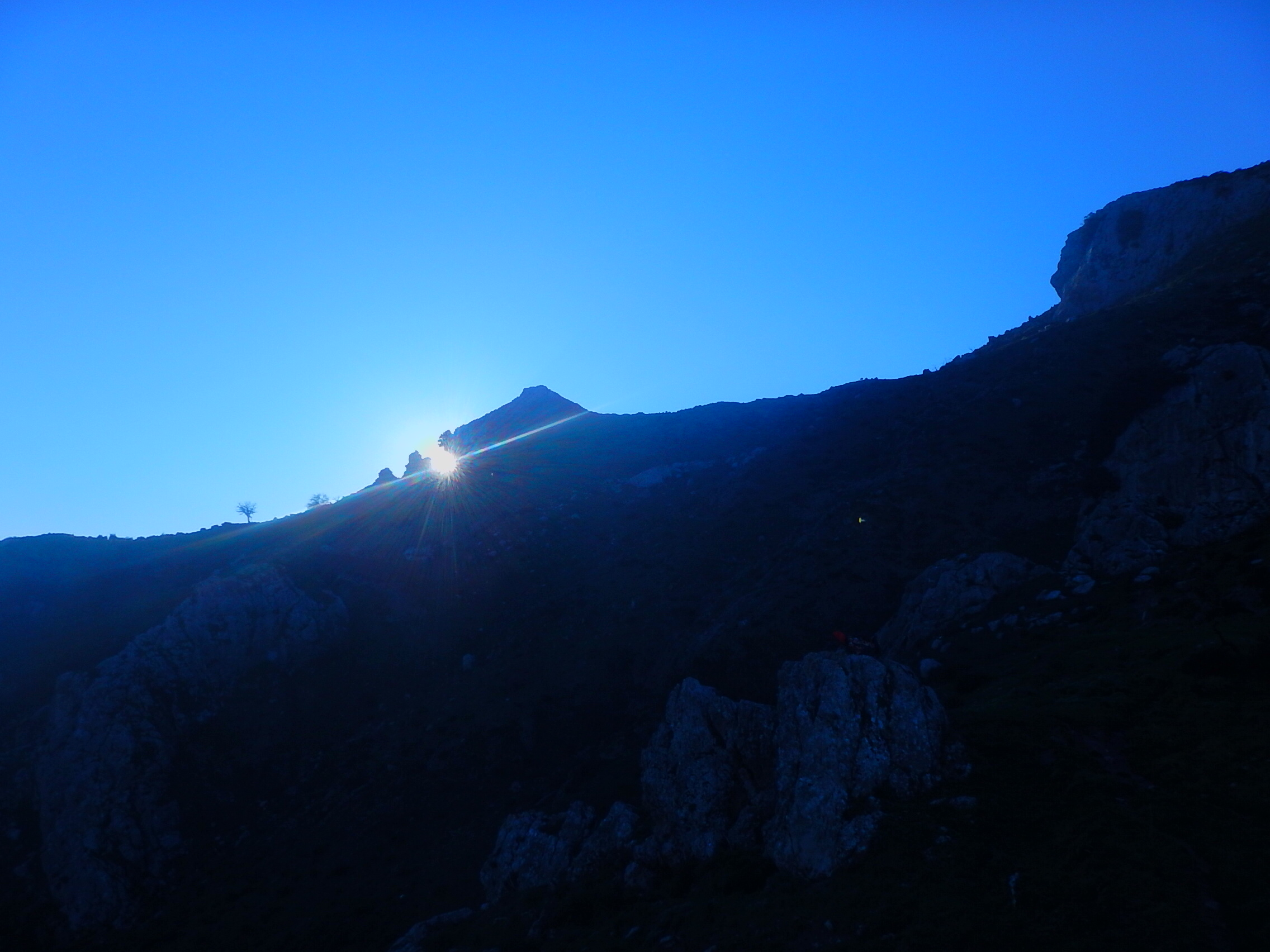
Sunset at the equinox from the prehistoric site of Pizzo Vento at Fondachelli Fantina, Sicily

A 32,500-year-old carved ivory mammoth tusk could contain the oldest known star chart (resembling the constellation Orion). It has also been suggested that drawings on the wall of the Lascaux caves in France dating from 33,000 to 10,000 years ago could be a graphical representation of the Pleiades, the Summer Triangle, and the Northern Crown. Ancient structures with possibly astronomical alignments (such as Stonehenge) probably fulfilled astronomical, religious, and social functions.

Ancient astronomical artifacts have been found throughout Europe. The artifacts demonstrate that Neolithic and Bronze Age Europeans had a sophisticated knowledge of mathematics and astronomy.

Among the discoveries are:

- Paleolithic archaeologist Alexander Marshack put forward a theory in 1972 that bone sticks from locations like Africa and Europe from possibly as long ago as 35,000 BC could be marked in ways that tracked the Moon's phases, an interpretation that has met with criticism.
- The Warren Field calendar in the Dee River valley of Scotland's Aberdeenshire was first excavated in 2004 but was revealed in 2013 as a find of huge significance. It is to date the oldest known calendar, created around 8,000 BC and predating all other calendars by some 5,000 years. The calendar takes the form of an early Mesolithic monument containing a series of 12 pits which appear to help the observer track lunar months by mimicking the phases of the Moon. It also aligns to sunrise at the winter solstice, thus coordinating the solar year with the lunar cycles. The monument had been maintained and periodically reshaped, perhaps up to hundreds of times, in response to shifting solar/lunar cycles, over the course of 6,000 years, until the calendar fell out of use around 4,000 years ago.
- Goseck circle is located in Germany and belongs to the linear pottery culture. First discovered in 1991, its significance was only clear after results from archaeological digs became available in 2004. The site is one of hundreds of similar circular enclosures built in a region encompassing Austria, Germany, and the Czech Republic during a 200-year period starting shortly after 5000 BC.

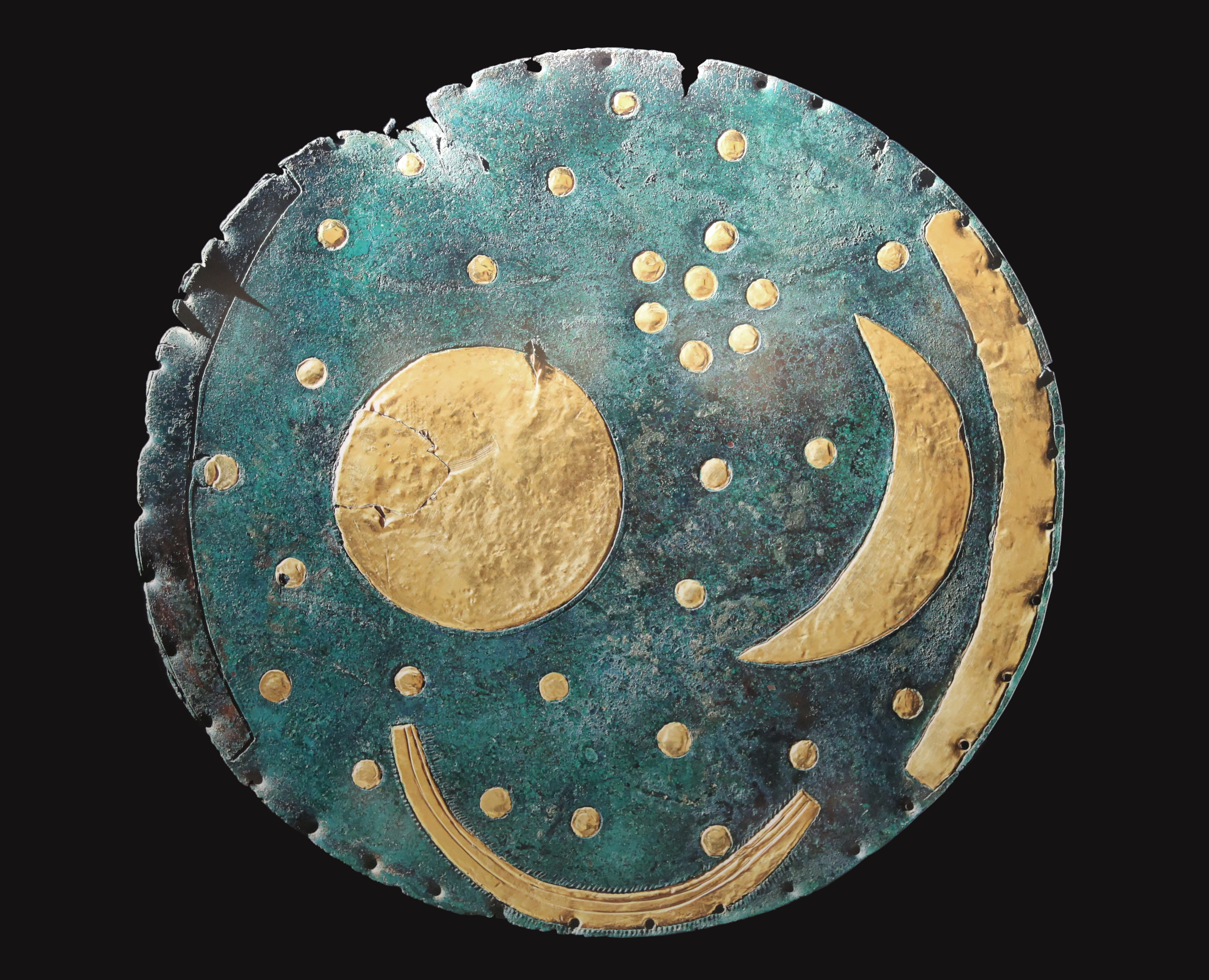
The Nebra sky disk, Germany, 1800–1600 BC

- The Nebra sky disc is a Bronze Age bronze disc that was buried on Mittenberg hill in Germany around 1600 BC. It measures about 30 cm (12 in) diameter with a mass of 2.2 kg (4.9 lb) and displays a blue-green patina (from oxidization) inlaid with gold symbols. Found by archeological thieves in 1999 and recovered in Switzerland in 2002, it was soon recognized as a spectacular discovery, among the most important of the 20th century. Investigations revealed that the object had been in use around 400 years before burial (2000 BC), but that its use had been forgotten by the time of burial. The inlaid gold depicted the full moon, a crescent moon about 4 or 5 days old, and the Pleiades star cluster in a specific arrangement, forming the earliest known depiction of celestial phenomena. Twelve lunar months pass in 354 days, requiring a calendar to insert a leap month every two or three years in order to keep synchronized with the solar year's seasons (making it lunisolar). The earliest known descriptions of this coordination were recorded by the Babylonians in the sixth or seventh centuries BC, over one thousand years later. Those descriptions verified ancient knowledge of the Nebra sky disc's celestial depiction as the precise arrangement needed to judge when to insert the intercalary month into a lunisolar calendar, making it an astronomical clock for regulating such a calendar a thousand or more years before any other known method.
- The Kokino site, discovered in 2001, sits atop an extinct volcanic cone at an elevation of 1,013 metres (3,323 ft), occupying about 0.5 hectares overlooking the surrounding countryside in North Macedonia. A Bronze Age astronomical observatory was constructed there around 1900 BC and continuously served the nearby community that lived there until about 700 BC. The central space was used to observe the rising of the Sun and full moon. Three markings locate sunrise at the summer and winter solstices and at the two equinoxes. Four more give the minimum and maximum declinations of the full moon: in summer, and in winter. Two measure the lengths of lunar months. Together, they reconcile solar and lunar cycles in marking the 235 lunations that occur during 19 solar years, regulating a lunar calendar. On a platform separate from the central space, at lower elevation, four stone seats (thrones) were made in north–south alignment, together with a trench marker cut in the eastern wall. This marker allows the rising Sun's light to fall on only the second throne, at midsummer (about July 31). It was used for ritual ceremony linking the ruler to the local sun god, and also marked the end of the growing season and time for harvest.

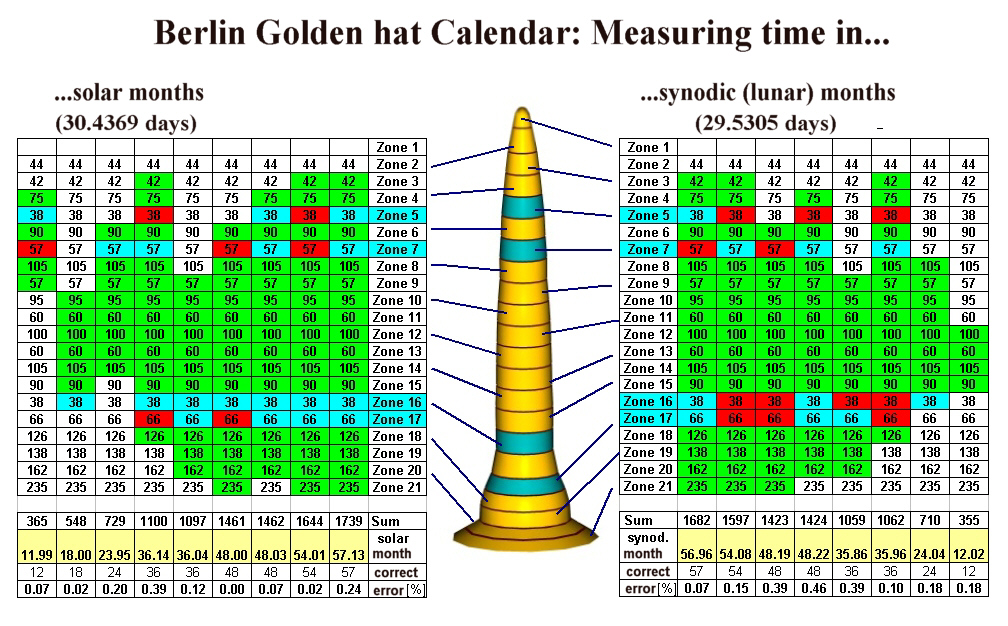
Calendrical functions of the Berlin Gold Hat c. 1000 BC

- Golden hats of Germany, France and Switzerland dating from 1400 to 800 BC are associated with the Bronze Age Urnfield culture. The Golden hats are decorated with a spiral motif of the Sun and the Moon. They were probably a kind of calendar used to calibrate between the lunar and solar calendars. Modern scholarship has demonstrated that the ornamentation of the gold leaf cones of the Schifferstadt type, to which the Berlin Gold Hat example belongs, represent systematic sequences in terms of number and types of ornaments per band. A detailed study of the Berlin example, which is the only fully preserved one, showed that the symbols probably represent a lunisolar calendar. The object would have permitted the determination of dates or periods in both lunar and solar calendars.

== Ancient times ==
Early cultures identified celestial objects with gods and spirits. They related these objects (and their movements) to phenomena such as rain, drought, seasons, and tides. It is generally believed that the first astronomers were priests who believed celestial objects and events to be manifestations of the divine, hence the connection to what is now called astrology.

Calendars of the world have often been set by observations of the Sun and Moon (marking the day, month, and year) and were important to agricultural societies, in which the harvest depended on planting at the correct time of year. The nearly full moon was also the only lighting for night-time travel into city markets.

The common modern calendar is based on the Roman calendar. Although originally a lunar calendar, it broke the traditional link of the month to the phases of the Moon and divided the year into twelve almost-equal months, that mostly alternated between thirty and thirty-one days. Julius Caesar instigated calendar reform in 46 BC and introduced what is now called the Julian calendar, based upon the 365 1/4 day year length originally proposed by the 4th century BC Greek astronomer Callippus.

=== Mesopotamia ===
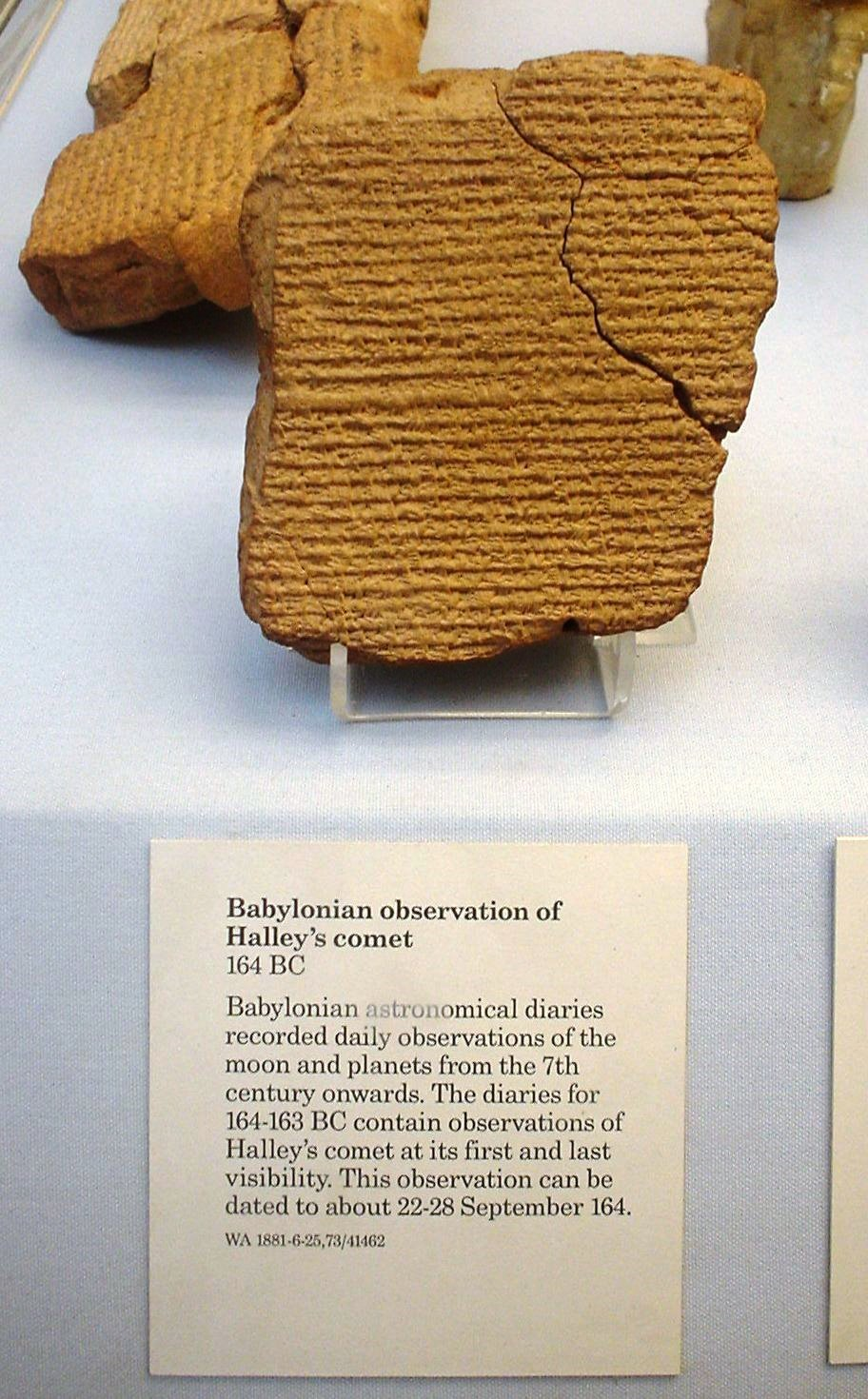
Babylonian tablet in the British Museum recording Halley's Comet in 164 BC

The origins of astronomy can be found in Mesopotamia, the "land between the rivers" Tigris and Euphrates, where the ancient kingdoms of Sumer, Assyria, and Babylonia were located. A form of writing known as cuneiform emerged among the Sumerians around 3500–3000 BC. Our knowledge of Sumerian astronomy is indirect, via the earliest Babylonian star catalogues dating from about 1200 BC. The fact that many star names appear in Sumerian suggests a continuity reaching into the Early Bronze Age. Astral theology, which gave planetary gods an important role in Mesopotamian mythology and religion, began with the Sumerians. They also used a sexagesimal (base 60) place-value number system, which simplified the task of recording very large and very small numbers. The modern practice of dividing a circle into 360 degrees, or an hour into 60 minutes, began with the Sumerians. For more information, see the articles on Babylonian numerals and mathematics.

Mesopotamia is worldwide the place of the earliest known astronomer and poet by name: Enheduanna, Akkadian high priestess to the lunar deity Nanna/Sin and princess, daughter of Sargon the Great (c. 2334 – c. 2279 BCE). She had the Moon tracked in her chambers and wrote poems about her divine Moon.

Classical sources frequently use the term Chaldeans for the astronomers of Mesopotamia, who were originally a people, before being identified with priest-scribes specializing in astrology and other forms of divination.

The first evidence of recognition that astronomical phenomena are periodic and of the application of mathematics to their prediction is Babylonian. Tablets dating back to the Old Babylonian period document the application of mathematics to the variation in the length of daylight over a solar year. Centuries of Babylonian observations of celestial phenomena are recorded in the series of cuneiform tablets known as the Enūma Anu Enlil. The oldest significant astronomical text that we possess is Tablet 63 of the Enūma Anu Enlil, the Venus tablet of Ammi-saduqa, which lists the first and last visible risings of Venus over a period of about 21 years and is the earliest evidence that the phenomena of a planet were recognized as periodic. The MUL.APIN contains catalogues of stars and constellations as well as schemes for predicting heliacal risings and the settings of the planets, lengths of daylight measured by a water clock, gnomon, shadows, and intercalations. The Babylonian GU text arranges stars in 'strings' that lie along declination circles and thus measure right-ascensions or time-intervals, and also employs the stars of the zenith, which are also separated by given right-ascensional differences.

A significant increase in the quality and frequency of Babylonian observations appeared during the reign of Nabonassar (747–733 BC). The systematic records of ominous phenomena in Babylonian astronomical diaries that began at this time allowed for the discovery of a repeating 18-year cycle of lunar eclipses, for example. The Greek astronomer Ptolemy later used Nabonassar's reign to fix the beginning of an era, since he felt that the earliest usable observations began at this time.

The last stages in the development of Babylonian astronomy took place during the time of the Seleucid Empire (323–60 BC). In the 3rd century BC, astronomers began to use "goal-year texts" to predict the motions of the planets. These texts compiled records of past observations to find repeating occurrences of ominous phenomena for each planet. About the same time, or shortly afterwards, astronomers created mathematical models that allowed them to predict these phenomena directly, without consulting records. A notable Babylonian astronomer from this time was Seleucus of Seleucia, who was a supporter of the heliocentric model.

Babylonian astronomy was the basis for much of what was done in Greek and Hellenistic astronomy, in classical Indian astronomy, in Sassanian Iran, in Byzantium, in Syria, in Islamic astronomy, in Central Asia, and in Western Europe.

=== India ===
Astronomy in the Indian subcontinent dates back to the period of Indus Valley Civilisation during 3rd millennium BC, when it was used to create calendars. As the Indus Valley Civilization did not leave behind written documents, the oldest extant Indian astronomical text is the Vedanga Jyotisha, dating from the Vedic period. The Vedanga Jyotisha is attributed to Lagadha and has an internal date of approximately 1350 BC, and describes rules for tracking the motions of the Sun and the Moon for the purposes of ritual. It is available in two recensions, one belonging to the Rig Veda, and the other to the Yajur Veda. According to the Vedanga Jyotisha, in a yuga or "era", there are 5 solar years, 67 lunar sidereal cycles, 1,830 days, 1,835 sidereal days, and 62 synodic months. During the sixth century, astronomy was influenced by the Greek and Byzantine astronomical traditions.

Aryabhata (476–550), in his magnum opus Aryabhatiya (499), propounded a computational system based on a planetary model in which the Earth was taken to be spinning on its axis and the periods of the planets were given with respect to the Sun. He accurately calculated many astronomical constants, such as the periods of the planets, times of the solar and lunar eclipses, and the instantaneous motion of the Moon. Early followers of Aryabhata's model included Varāhamihira, Brahmagupta, and Bhāskara II.

In the 6th century, Varāhamihira compiled his Pañcasiddhāntikā, a summary of five earlier astronomical traditions evaluated by their computational accuracy (sphuṭatva): the Sūrya (considered the most accurate), the Pauliśa and Romaka (which include Hellenistic and Alexandrian methods, including epicyclic models), the Vāsiṣṭha, and the Paitāmaha (based on the Vedanga Jyotisha system).

Astronomy was advanced during the Shunga Empire, and many star catalogues were produced during this time. The Shunga period is known as the "Golden age of astronomy in India". It saw the development of calculations for the motions and places of various planets, their rising and setting, conjunctions, and the calculation of eclipses.

By the sixth century, Indian astronomers believed that comets were apparitions that re-appeared periodically. This was the view expressed in the sixth century by the astronomers Varahamihira and Bhadrabahu. The tenth-century astronomer Bhattotpala listed the names and estimated periods of certain comets, but it is not known how these figures were calculated or how accurate they were.

=== Greece and Hellenistic world ===
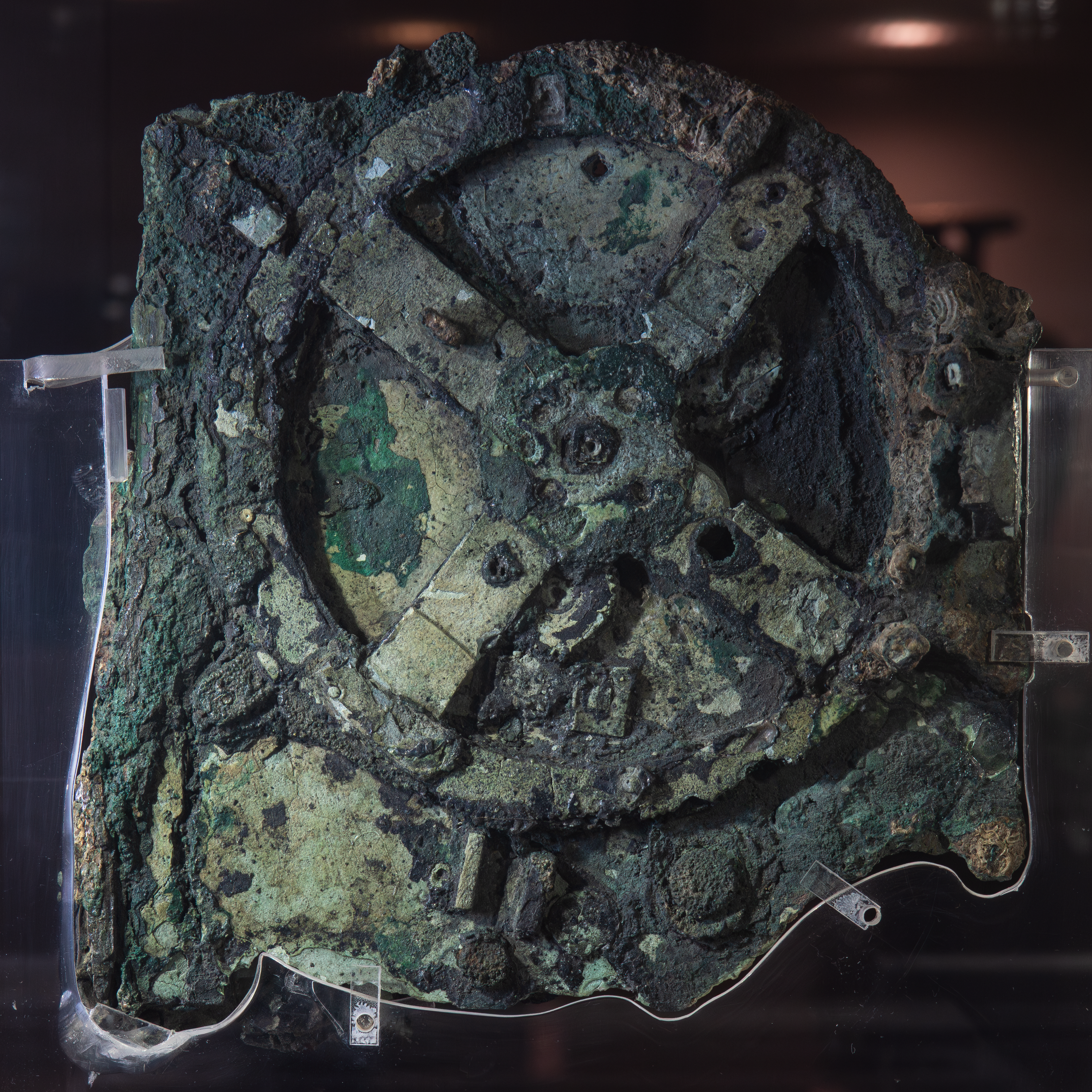
The Antikythera Mechanism was an analog computer dating from between 200 BC to 80 BC designed to calculate the positions of astronomical objects.

The Ancient Greeks developed astronomy, which they treated as a branch of mathematics, to a highly sophisticated level. The first geometrical, three-dimensional models to explain the apparent motion of the planets were developed in the 4th century BC by Eudoxus of Cnidus and Callippus of Cyzicus. Their models were based on nested homocentric spheres centered upon the Earth. Their younger contemporary Heraclides Ponticus proposed that the Earth rotates around its axis.

A different approach to celestial phenomena was taken by natural philosophers such as Plato and Aristotle. They were less concerned with developing mathematical predictive models than with developing an explanation of the reasons for the motions of the Cosmos. In his Timaeus, Plato described the universe as a spherical body divided into circles carrying the planets and governed according to harmonic intervals by a world soul. Aristotle, drawing on the mathematical model of Eudoxus, proposed that the universe was made of a complex system of concentric spheres, whose circular motions combined to carry the planets around the Earth. This basic cosmological model prevailed, in various forms, until the 16th century.

In the 3rd century BC Aristarchus of Samos was the first to suggest a heliocentric system, although only fragmentary descriptions of his idea survive. Eratosthenes estimated the circumference of the Earth with great accuracy (see also: history of geodesy).

Greek geometrical astronomy developed away from the model of concentric spheres to employ more complex models in which an eccentric circle would carry around a smaller circle, called an epicycle which in turn carried around a planet. The first such model is attributed to Apollonius of Perga and further developments in it were carried out in the 2nd century BC by Hipparchus of Nicea. Hipparchus made a number of other contributions, including the first measurement of precession and the compilation of the first star catalog in which he proposed our modern system of apparent magnitudes.

The Antikythera mechanism, an ancient Greek astronomical observational device for calculating the movements of the Sun and the Moon, possibly the planets, dates from about 150–100 BC, and was the first ancestor of an astronomical computer. It was discovered in an ancient shipwreck off the Greek island of Antikythera, between Kythera and Crete. The device became famous for its use of a differential gear, previously believed to have been invented in the 16th century, and the miniaturization and complexity of its parts, comparable to a clock made in the 18th century. The original mechanism is displayed in the Bronze collection of the National Archaeological Museum of Athens, accompanied by a replica.

=== Ptolemaic system ===
Depending on the historian's viewpoint, the acme or corruption of Classical physical astronomy is seen with Ptolemy, a Greco-Roman astronomer from Alexandria of Egypt, who wrote the classic comprehensive presentation of geocentric astronomy, the Megale Syntaxis (Great Synthesis), better known by its Arabic title Almagest, which had a lasting effect on astronomy up to the Renaissance. In his Planetary Hypotheses, Ptolemy ventured into the realm of cosmology, developing a physical model of his geometric system, in a universe many times smaller than the more realistic conception of Aristarchus of Samos four centuries earlier.

=== Egypt ===
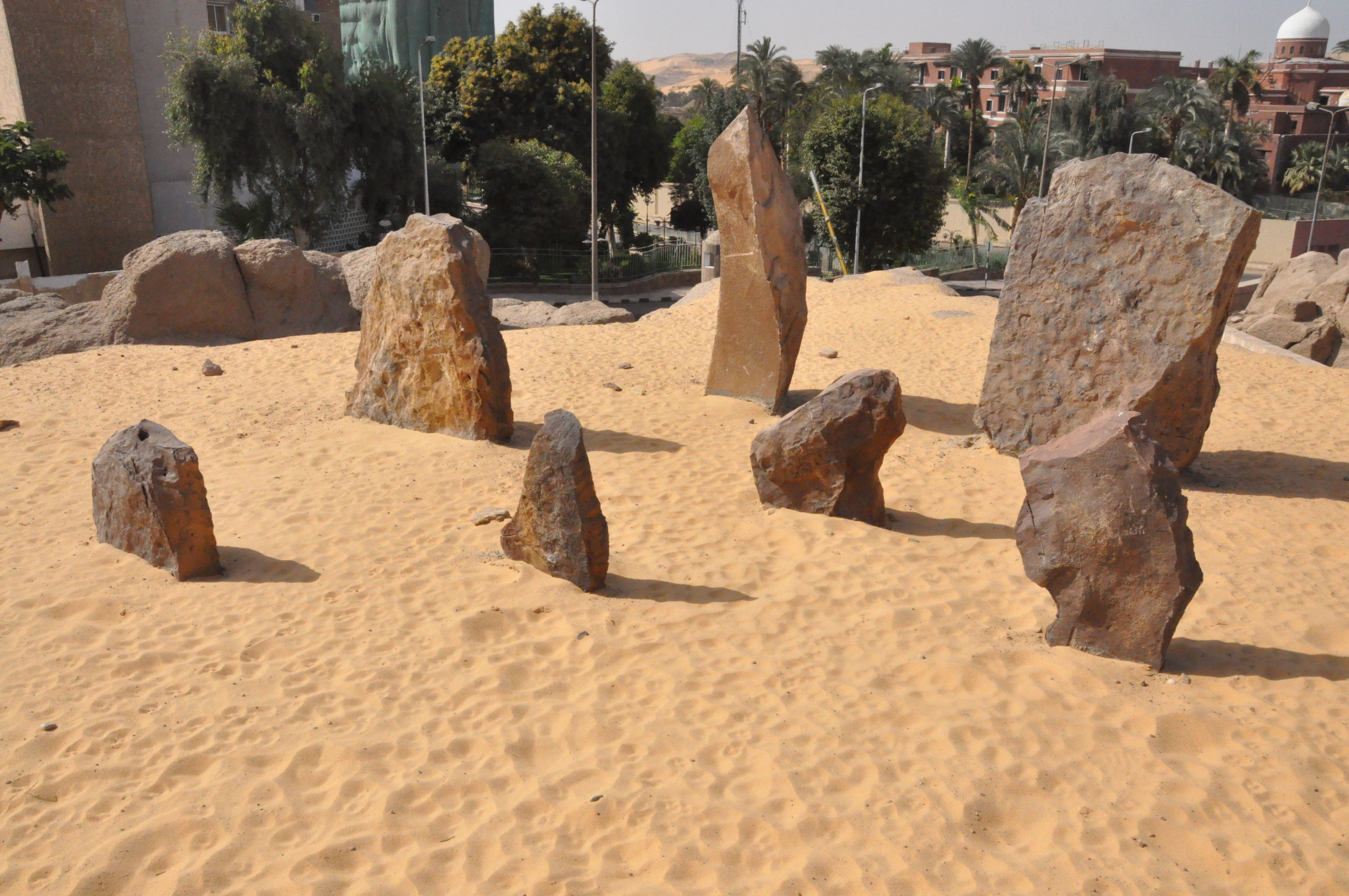
Megaliths from Nabta Playa, constructed by Neolithic populations, located in Aswan, Upper Egypt. Excavations of the megalith structures were completed in 2008.

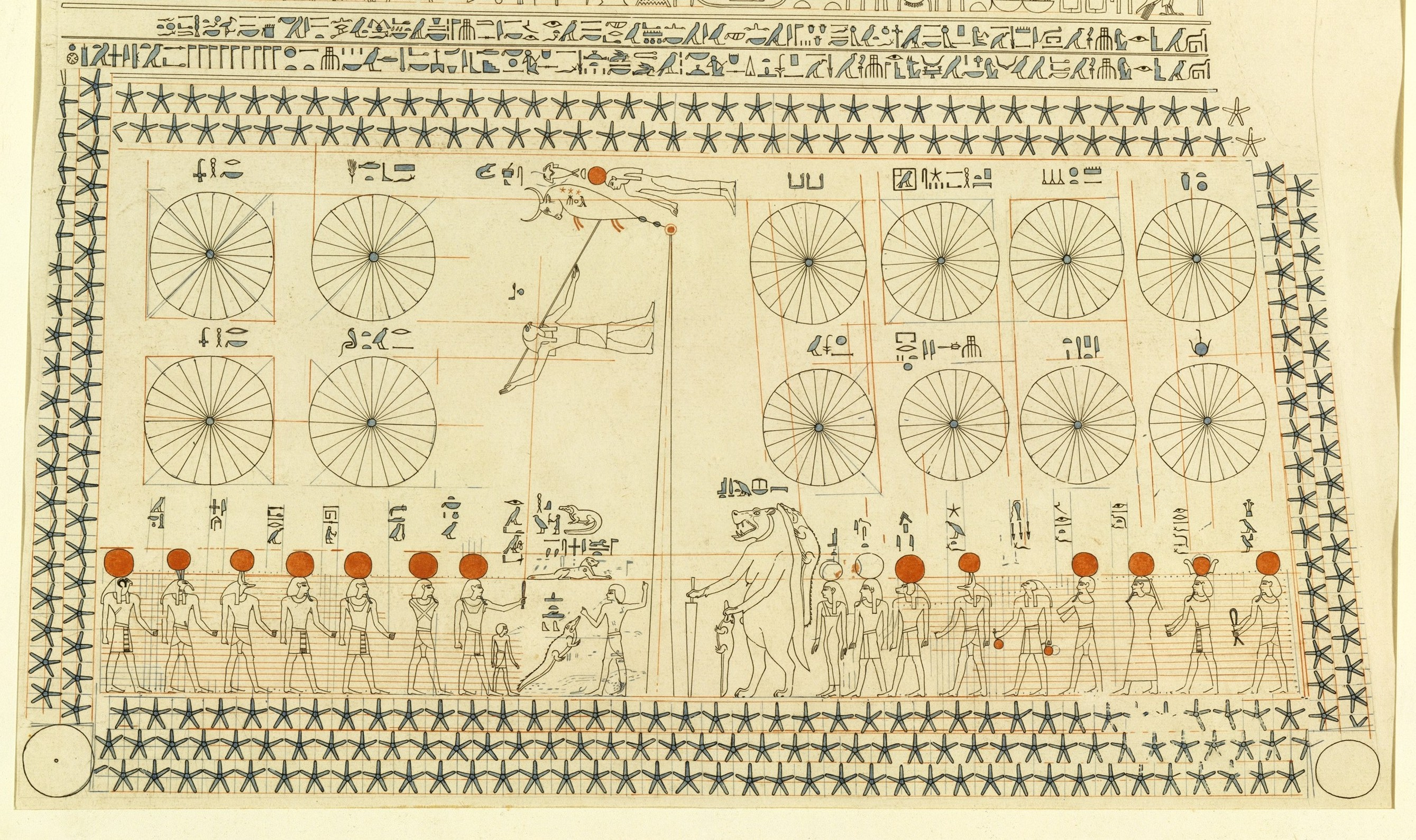
Segment of the astronomical ceiling of Senenmut's Tomb (circa 1479–1458 BC), depicting constellations, protective deities, and twenty-four segmented wheels for the hours of the day and the months of the year

Megalithic structures located in Nabta Playa, Upper Egypt featured astronomy, calendar arrangements in alignment with the heliacal rising of Sirius and supported calibration the yearly calendar for the annual Nile flood. These practices have been linked with the emergence of cosmology in Old Kingdom Egypt.

The precise orientation of the Egyptian pyramids affords a lasting demonstration of the high degree of technical skill in watching the heavens attained in the 3rd millennium BC. It has been shown the Pyramids were aligned towards the pole star, which, because of the precession of the equinoxes, was at that time Thuban, a faint star in the constellation of Draco. Evaluation of the site of the temple of Amun-Re at Karnak, taking into account the change over time of the obliquity of the ecliptic, has shown that the Great Temple was aligned on the rising of the midwinter Sun. The length of the corridor down which sunlight would travel would have limited illumination at other times of the year. The Egyptians also found the position of Sirius (the dog star), who they believed was Anubis, their jackal-headed god, moving through the heavens. Its position was critical to their civilisation as when it rose heliacal in the east before sunrise it foretold the flooding of the Nile. It is also the origin of the phrase "dog days of summer".

Astronomy played a considerable part in religious matters for fixing the dates of festivals and determining the hours of the night. The titles of several temple books are preserved recording the movements and phases of the Sun, Moon, and stars. The rising of Sirius (Egyptian: Sopdet, Greek: Sothis) at the beginning of the inundation was a particularly important point to fix in the yearly calendar.

Writing in the Roman era, Clement of Alexandria gives some idea of the importance of astronomical observations to the sacred rites:

And after the Singer advances the Astrologer (ὡροσκόπος), with a horologium (ὡρολόγιον) in his hand, and a palm (φοίνιξ), the symbols of astrology. He must know by heart the Hermetic astrological books, which are four in number. Of these, one is about the arrangement of the fixed stars that are visible; one on the positions of the Sun and Moon and five planets; one on the conjunctions and phases of the Sun and Moon; and one concerns their risings.

The Astrologer's instruments (horologium and palm) are a plumb line and sighting instrument. They have been identified with two inscribed objects in the Berlin Museum; a short handle from which a plumb line was hung, and a palm branch with a sight-slit in the broader end. The latter was held close to the eye, the former in the other hand, perhaps at arm's length. The "Hermetic" books which Clement refers to are the Egyptian theological texts, which probably have nothing to do with Hellenistic Hermetism.

From the tables of stars on the ceiling of the tombs of Rameses VI and Rameses IX it seems that for fixing the hours of the night a man seated on the ground faced the Astrologer in such a position that the line of observation of the pole star passed over the middle of his head. On the different days of the year each hour was determined by a fixed star culminating or nearly culminating in it, and the position of these stars at the time is given in the tables as in the centre, on the left eye, on the right shoulder, etc. According to the texts, in founding or rebuilding temples the north axis was determined by the same apparatus, and we may conclude that it was the usual one for astronomical observations. In careful hands it might give results of a high degree of accuracy.

=== China ===
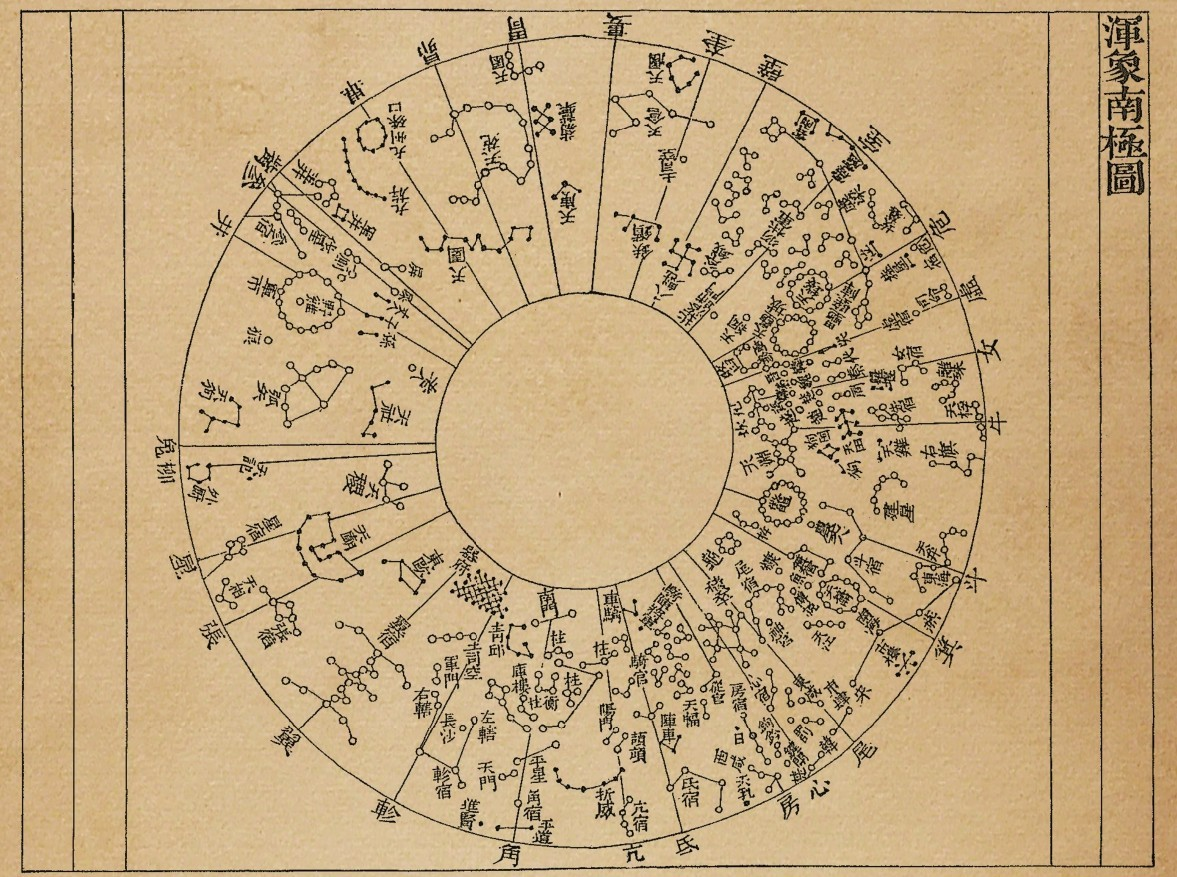
Printed star map of Su Song (1020–1101) showing the south polar projection

The astronomy of East Asia began in China. Solar term was completed in Warring States period. The knowledge of Chinese astronomy was introduced into East Asia.

Astronomy in China has a long history. Detailed records of astronomical observations were kept from about the 6th century BC, until the introduction of Western astronomy and the telescope in the 17th century. Chinese astronomers were able to precisely predict eclipses.

Much of early Chinese astronomy was for the purpose of timekeeping. The Chinese used a lunisolar calendar, but because the cycles of the Sun and the Moon are different, astronomers often prepared new calendars and made observations for that purpose.

Astrological divination was also an important part of astronomy. Astronomers took careful note of "guest stars" (Chinese: 客星; pinyin: kèxīng; lit. 'guest star') which suddenly appeared among the fixed stars. They were the first to record a supernova, in the Astrological Annals of the Houhanshu in 185 AD. Also, the supernova that created the Crab Nebula in 1054 is an example of a "guest star" observed by Chinese astronomers, although it was not recorded by their European contemporaries. Ancient astronomical records of phenomena like supernovae and comets are sometimes used in modern astronomical studies.

The world's first star catalogue was made by Gan De, a Chinese astronomer, in the 4th century BC.

=== Mesoamerica ===
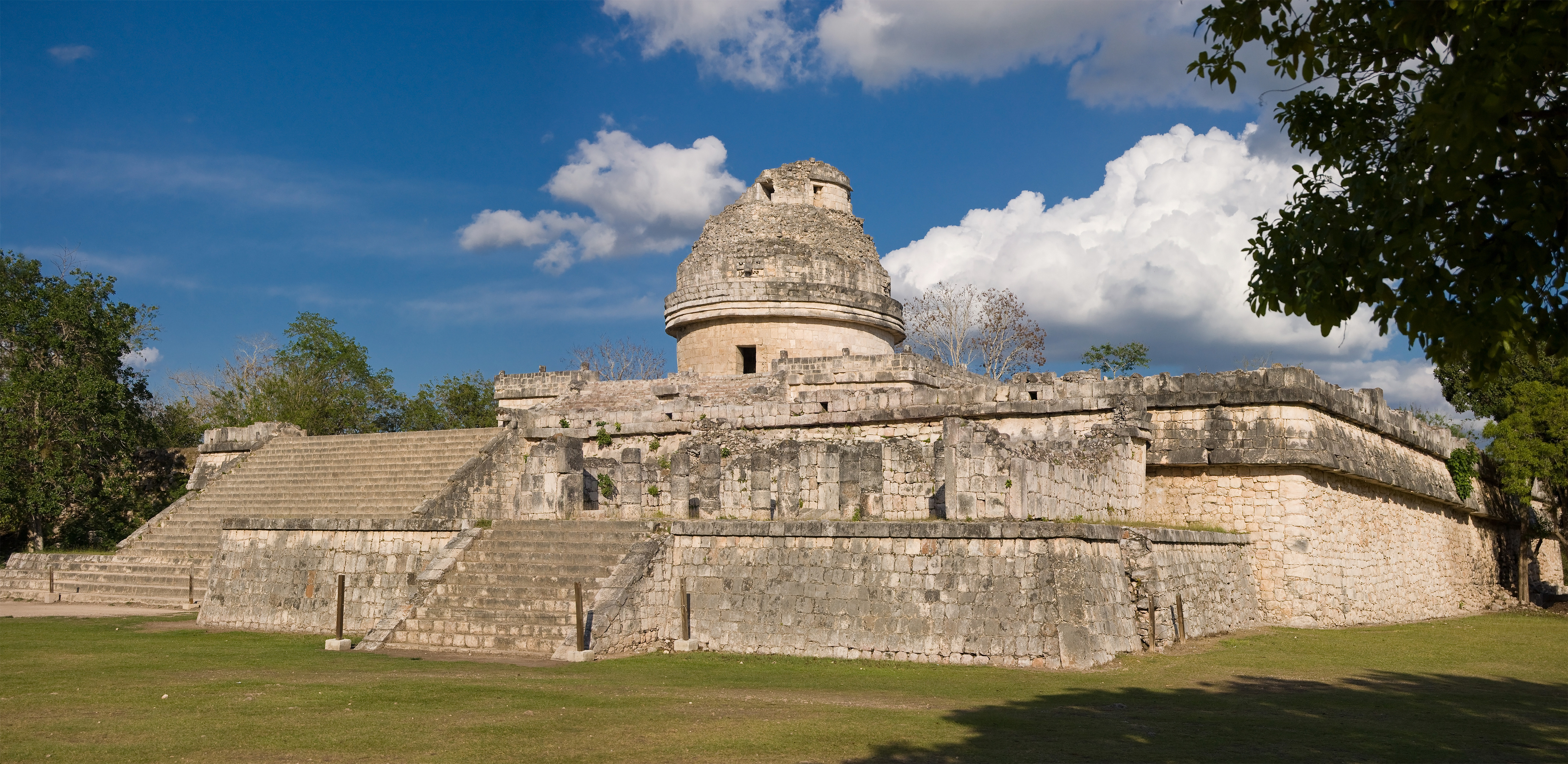
"El Caracol" observatory temple at Chichen Itza, Mexico

Maya astronomical codices include detailed tables for calculating phases of the Moon, the recurrence of eclipses, and the appearance and disappearance of Venus as morning and evening star. The Maya based their calendrics in the carefully calculated cycles of the Pleiades, the Sun, the Moon, Venus, Jupiter, Saturn, Mars, and also they had a precise description of the eclipses as depicted in the Dresden Codex, as well as the ecliptic or zodiac, and the Milky Way was crucial in their Cosmology. A number of important Maya structures are believed to have been oriented toward the extreme risings and settings of Venus. To the ancient Maya, Venus was the patron of war and many recorded battles are believed to have been timed to the motions of this planet. Mars is also mentioned in preserved astronomical codices and early mythology.

Although the Maya calendar was not tied to the Sun, both astronomy and an intricate numerological scheme for the measurement of time were vitally important components of Maya religion.

The Maya believed that the Earth was the center of all things, and that the stars, moons, and planets were gods. They believed that their movements were the gods traveling between the Earth and other celestial destinations. Many key events in Maya culture were timed around celestial events, in the belief that certain gods would be present.

== Middle Ages ==
=== Middle East ===
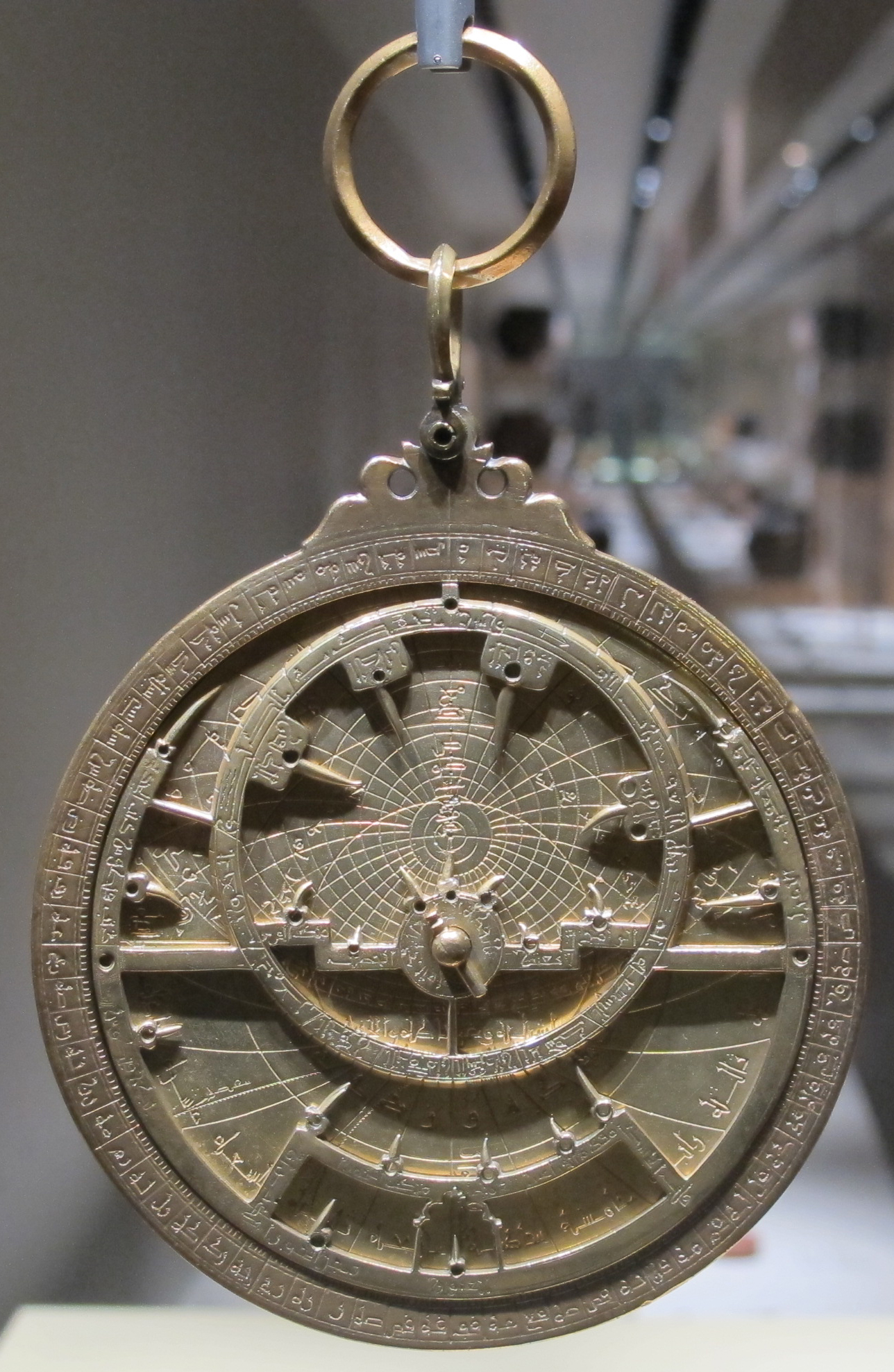
Arabic astrolabe from 1079 to 1080 AD

The Arabic and the Persian world under Islam had become highly cultured, and many important works of knowledge from Greek astronomy, Indian astronomy, and Persian astronomy were translated into Arabic, which were then used and stored in libraries throughout the area. An important contribution by Islamic astronomers was their emphasis on observational astronomy. This led to the emergence of the first astronomical observatories in the Muslim world by the early 9th century. Zij star catalogues were produced at these observatories.

In the ninth century, Persian astrologer Albumasar was thought to be one of the greatest astrologer at that time. His practical manuals for training astrologers profoundly influenced Muslim intellectual history and, through translations, that of western Europe and Byzantium In the 10th century, Albumasar's "Introduction" was one of the most important sources for the recovery of Aristotle for medieval European scholars. Abd al-Rahman al-Sufi (Azophi) carried out observations on the stars and described their positions, magnitudes, brightness, and colour and drawings for each constellation in his Book of Fixed Stars. He also gave the first descriptions and pictures of "A Little Cloud" now known as the Andromeda Galaxy. He mentions it as lying before the mouth of a Big Fish, an Arabic constellation. This "cloud" was apparently commonly known to the Isfahan astronomers, very probably before 905 AD. The first recorded mention of the Large Magellanic Cloud was also given by al-Sufi. In 1006, Ali ibn Ridwan observed SN 1006, the brightest supernova in recorded history, and left a detailed description of the temporary star.

In the late tenth century, a huge observatory was built near Tehran, Iran, by the astronomer Abu-Mahmud al-Khujandi who observed a series of meridian transits of the Sun, which allowed him to calculate the tilt of the Earth's axis relative to the Sun. He noted that measurements by earlier (Indian, then Greek) astronomers had found higher values for this angle, possible evidence that the axial tilt is not constant but was in fact decreasing. In 11th-century Persia, Omar Khayyám compiled many tables and performed a reformation of the calendar that was more accurate than the Julian and came close to the Gregorian.

Other Muslim advances in astronomy included the collection and correction of previous astronomical data, resolving significant problems in the Ptolemaic model, the development of the universal latitude-independent astrolabe by Arzachel, the invention of numerous other astronomical instruments, Ja'far Muhammad ibn Mūsā ibn Shākir's belief that the heavenly bodies and celestial spheres were subject to the same physical laws as Earth, and the introduction of empirical testing by Ibn al-Shatir, who produced the first model of lunar motion which matched physical observations.

Natural philosophy (particularly Aristotelian physics) was separated from astronomy by Ibn al-Haytham (Alhazen) in the 11th century, by Ibn al-Shatir in the 14th century, and Qushji in the 15th century.

=== India ===
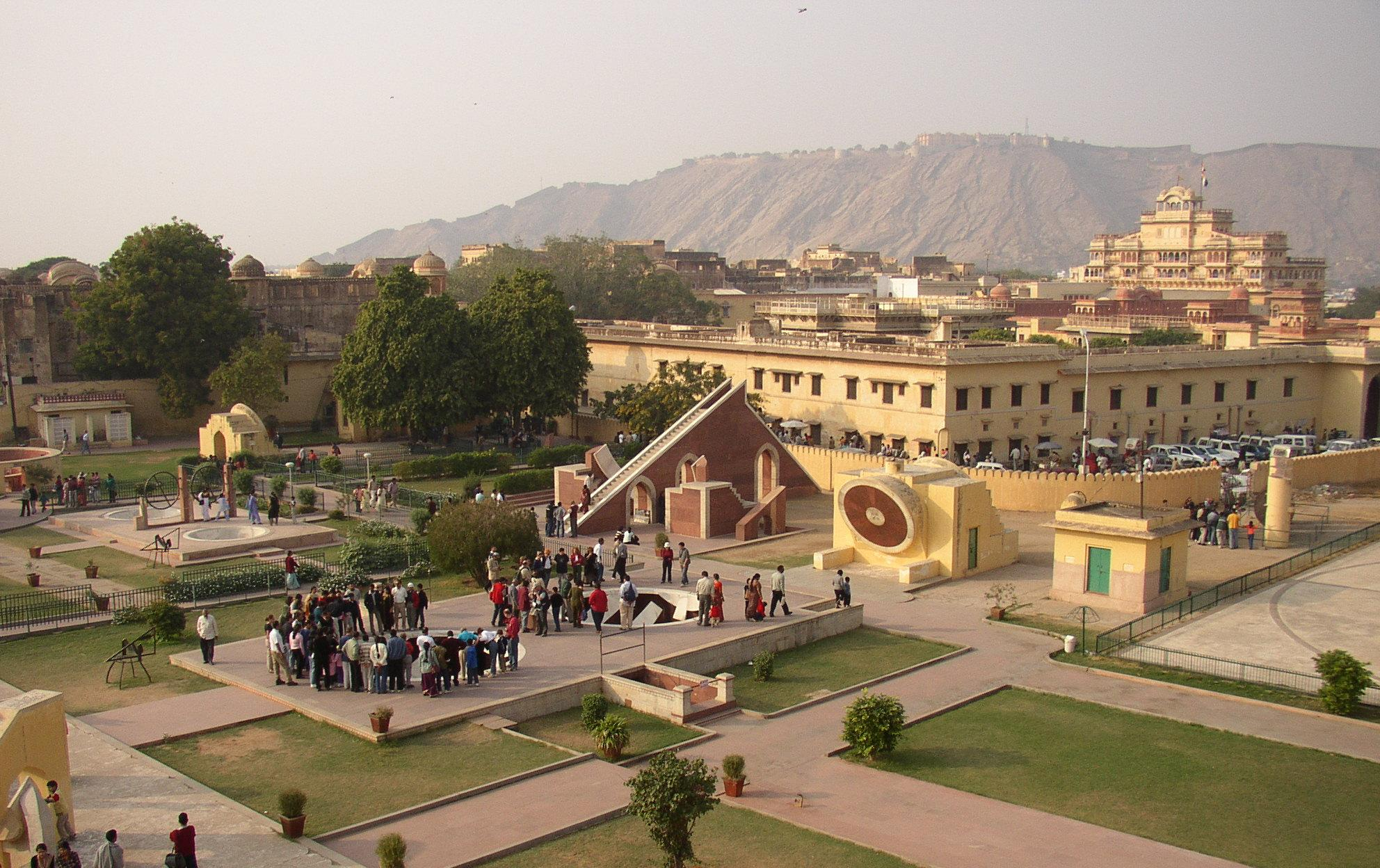
Historical Jantar Mantar observatory in Jaipur, India

Bhāskara II (1114–1185) was the head of the astronomical observatory at Ujjain, continuing the mathematical tradition of Brahmagupta. He wrote the Siddhantasiromani which consists of two parts: Goladhyaya (sphere) and Grahaganita (mathematics of the celestial bodies). He also calculated the time taken for the Sun to orbit the Earth to 365 days, 6 hours, 12 minutes, and 9 seconds. The Buddhist University of Nalanda at the time offered formal courses in astronomical studies.

Other important astronomers from India include Madhava of Sangamagrama, Nilakantha Somayaji and Jyeshtadeva, who were members of the Kerala school of astronomy and mathematics from the 14th century to the 16th century. Nilakantha Somayaji, in his Aryabhatiyabhasya, a commentary on Aryabhata's Aryabhatiya, developed his own computational system for a partially heliocentric planetary model, in which Mercury, Venus, Mars, Jupiter and Saturn orbit the Sun, which in turn orbits the Earth, similar to the Tychonic system later proposed by Tycho Brahe in the late 16th century. Nilakantha's system, however, was mathematically more efficient than the Tychonic system, due to correctly taking into account the equation of the centre and latitudinal motion of Mercury and Venus. Most astronomers of the Kerala school of astronomy and mathematics who followed him accepted his planetary model.

=== Western Europe ===
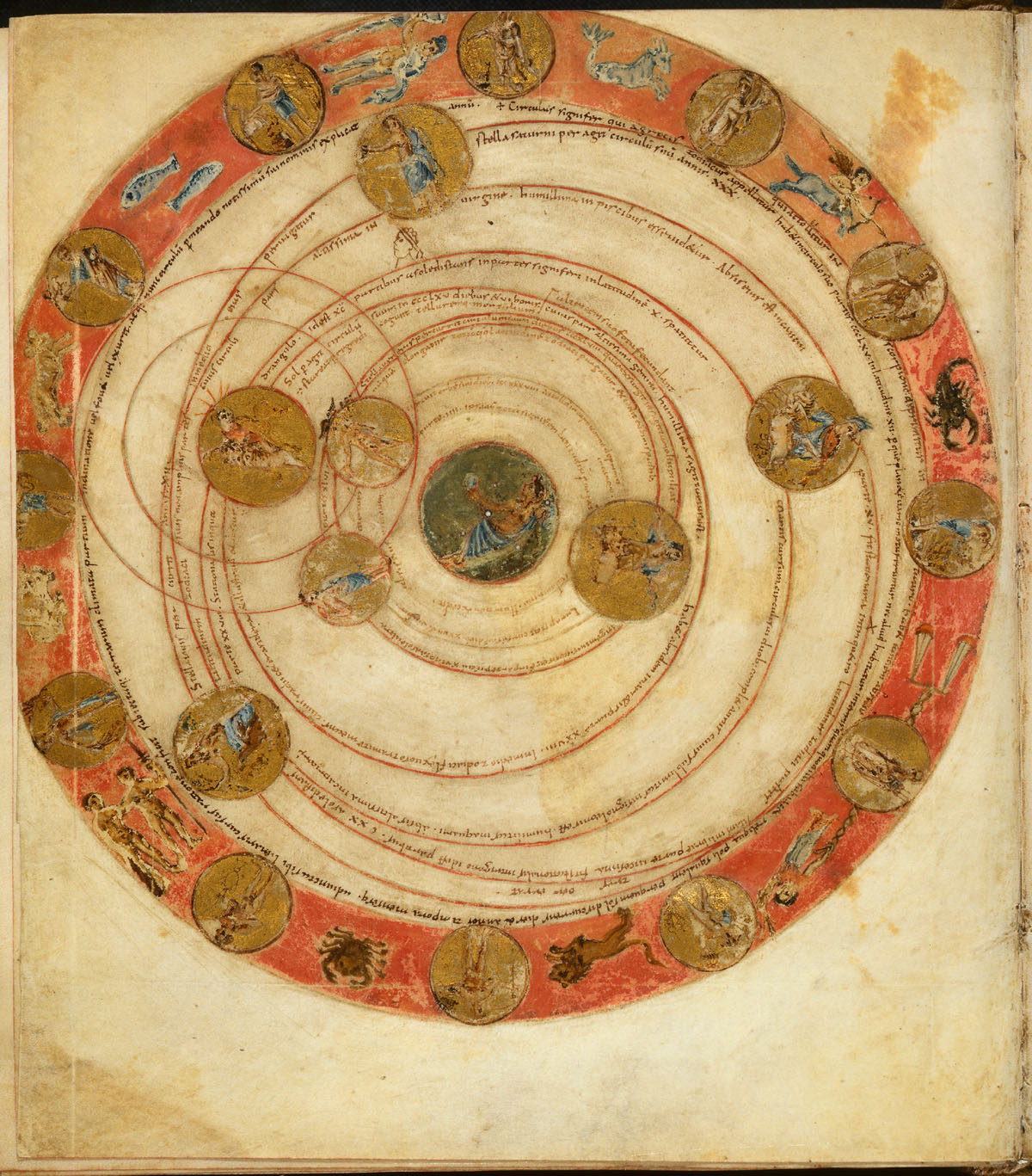
9th-century diagram of the positions of the seven planets on 18 March 816, from the Leiden Aratea

After the significant contributions of Greek scholars to the development of astronomy, it entered a relatively static era in Western Europe from the Roman era through the 12th century. This lack of progress has led some astronomers to assert that nothing happened in Western European astronomy during the Middle Ages. Recent investigations, however, have revealed a more complex picture of the study and teaching of astronomy in the period from the 4th to the 16th centuries.

Western Europe entered the Middle Ages with great difficulties that affected the continent's intellectual production. The advanced astronomical treatises of classical antiquity were written in Greek, and with the decline of knowledge of that language, only simplified summaries and practical texts were available for study. The most influential writers to pass on this ancient tradition in Latin were Macrobius, Pliny, Martianus Capella, and Calcidius. In the 6th century Bishop Gregory of Tours noted that he had learned his astronomy from reading Martianus Capella, and went on to employ this rudimentary astronomy to describe a method by which monks could determine the time of prayer at night by watching the stars.

In the 7th century the English monk Bede of Jarrow published an influential text, On the Reckoning of Time, providing churchmen with the practical astronomical knowledge needed to compute the proper date of Easter using a procedure called the computus. This text remained an important element of the education of clergy from the 7th century until well after the rise of the Universities in the 12th century.

The range of surviving ancient Roman writings on astronomy and the teachings of Bede and his followers began to be studied in earnest during the revival of learning sponsored by the emperor Charlemagne. By the 9th century rudimentary techniques for calculating the position of the planets were circulating in Western Europe; medieval scholars recognized their flaws, but texts describing these techniques continued to be copied, reflecting an interest in the motions of the planets and in their astrological significance.

Building on this astronomical background, in the 10th century European scholars such as Gerbert of Aurillac began to travel to Spain and Sicily to seek out learning which they had heard existed in the Arabic-speaking world. There they first encountered various practical astronomical techniques concerning the calendar and timekeeping, most notably those dealing with the astrolabe. Soon scholars such as Hermann of Reichenau were writing texts in Latin on the uses and construction of the astrolabe and others, such as Walcher of Malvern, were using the astrolabe to observe the time of eclipses in order to test the validity of computistical tables.

By the 12th century, scholars were traveling to Spain and Sicily to seek out more advanced astronomical and astrological texts, which they translated into Latin from Arabic and Greek to further enrich the astronomical knowledge of Western Europe. The arrival of these new texts coincided with the rise of the universities in medieval Europe, in which they soon found a home. Reflecting the introduction of astronomy into the universities, John of Sacrobosco wrote a series of influential introductory astronomy textbooks: the Sphere, a Computus, a text on the Quadrant, and another on Calculation.

In the 14th century, Nicole Oresme, later bishop of Liseux, showed that neither the scriptural texts nor the physical arguments advanced against the movement of the Earth were demonstrative and adduced the argument of simplicity for the theory that the Earth moves, and not the heavens. However, he concluded "everyone maintains, and I think myself, that the heavens do move and not the earth: For God hath established the world which shall not be moved." In the 15th century, Cardinal Nicholas of Cusa suggested in some of his scientific writings that the Earth revolved around the Sun, and that each star is itself a distant sun.

== Renaissance and Early Modern Europe ==
=== Copernican Revolution ===
During the renaissance period, astronomy began to undergo a revolution in thought known as the Copernican Revolution, which gets the name from the astronomer Nicolaus Copernicus, who proposed a heliocentric system, in which the planets revolved around the Sun and not the Earth. His De revolutionibus orbium coelestium was published in 1543. While in the long term this was a very controversial claim, in the very beginning it only brought minor controversy. The theory became the dominant view because many figures, most notably Galileo Galilei, Johannes Kepler and Isaac Newton championed and improved upon the work. Other figures also aided this new model despite not believing the overall theory, like Tycho Brahe, with his well-known observations.

Brahe, a Danish noble, was an essential astronomer in this period. He came on the astronomical scene with the publication of De nova stella, in which he disproved conventional wisdom on the supernova SN 1572 (As bright as Venus at its peak, SN 1572 later became invisible to the naked eye, disproving the Aristotelian doctrine of the immutability of the heavens.) He also created the Tychonic system, where the Sun and Moon and the stars revolve around the Earth, but the other five planets revolve around the Sun. This system blended the mathematical benefits of the Copernican system with the "physical benefits" of the Ptolemaic system. This was one of the systems people believed in when they did not accept heliocentrism, but could no longer accept the Ptolemaic system. He is most known for his highly accurate observations of the stars and the planets. Later he moved to Prague and continued his work. In Prague he was at work on the Rudolphine Tables, that were not finished until after his death. The Rudolphine Tables was a star map designed to be more accurate than either the Alfonsine tables, made in the 1300s, and the Prutenic Tables, which were inaccurate. He was assisted at this time by his assistant Johannes Kepler, who would later use his observations to finish Brahe's works and for his theories as well.

After the death of Brahe, Kepler was deemed his successor and was given the job of completing Brahe's uncompleted works, like the Rudolphine Tables. He completed the Rudolphine Tables in 1624, although it was not published for several years. Like many other figures of this era, he was subject to religious and political troubles, like the Thirty Years' War, which led to chaos that almost destroyed some of his works. Kepler was, however, the first to attempt to derive mathematical predictions of celestial motions from assumed physical causes. He discovered the three Kepler's laws of planetary motion that now carry his name, those laws being as follows:

1. The orbit of a planet is an ellipse with the Sun at one of the two foci.
2. A line segment joining a planet and the Sun sweeps out equal areas during equal intervals of time.
3. The square of the orbital period of a planet is proportional to the cube of the semi-major axis of its orbit.

With these laws, he managed to improve upon the existing heliocentric model. The first two were published in 1609. Kepler's contributions improved upon the overall system, giving it more credibility because it adequately explained events and could cause more reliable predictions. Before this, the Copernican model was just as unreliable as the Ptolemaic model. This improvement came because Kepler realized the orbits were not perfect circles, but ellipses.

=== Galileo ===
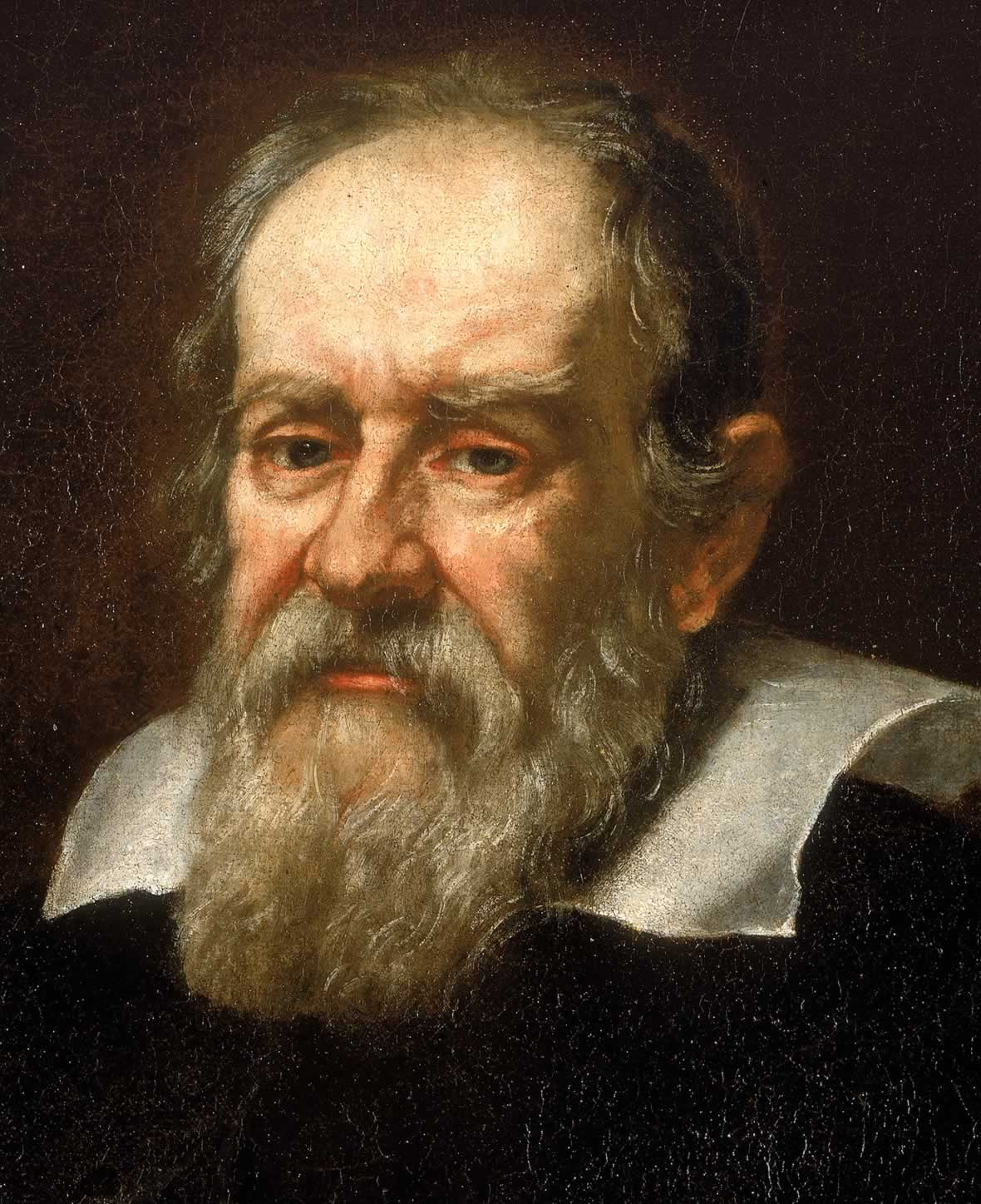
Galileo Galilei (1564–1642) crafted his own telescope and discovered that the Moon had craters, that Jupiter had moons, that the Sun had spots, and that Venus had phases like the Moon. Portrait by Justus Sustermans.

The invention of the telescope in 1608 revolutionized the study of astronomy. Galileo Galilei was among the first to use a telescope to observe the sky, after constructing a 20x refractor telescope. He discovered the four largest moons of Jupiter in 1610, which are now collectively known as the Galilean moons, in his honor. This discovery was the first known observation of satellites orbiting another planet. He also found that the Moon had craters and observed, and correctly explained sunspots, and that Venus exhibited a full set of phases resembling lunar phases. Galileo argued that these facts demonstrated incompatibility with the Ptolemaic model, which could not explain the phenomenon and would even contradict it. With Jupiter's moons, he demonstrated that the Earth does not have to have everything orbiting it and that other bodies could orbit another planet, such as the Earth orbiting the Sun. In the Ptolemaic system the celestial bodies were supposed to be perfect so such objects should not have craters or sunspots. The phases of Venus could only happen in the event that Venus orbits around the Sun, which did not happen in the Ptolemaic system. He, as the most famous example, had to face challenges from church officials, more specifically the Roman Inquisition. They accused him of heresy because these beliefs went against the teachings of the Roman Catholic Church and were challenging the Catholic church's authority when it was at its weakest. While he was able to avoid punishment for a little while he was eventually tried and pled guilty to heresy in 1633. Although this came at some expense, his book was banned, and he was put under house arrest until he died in 1642.

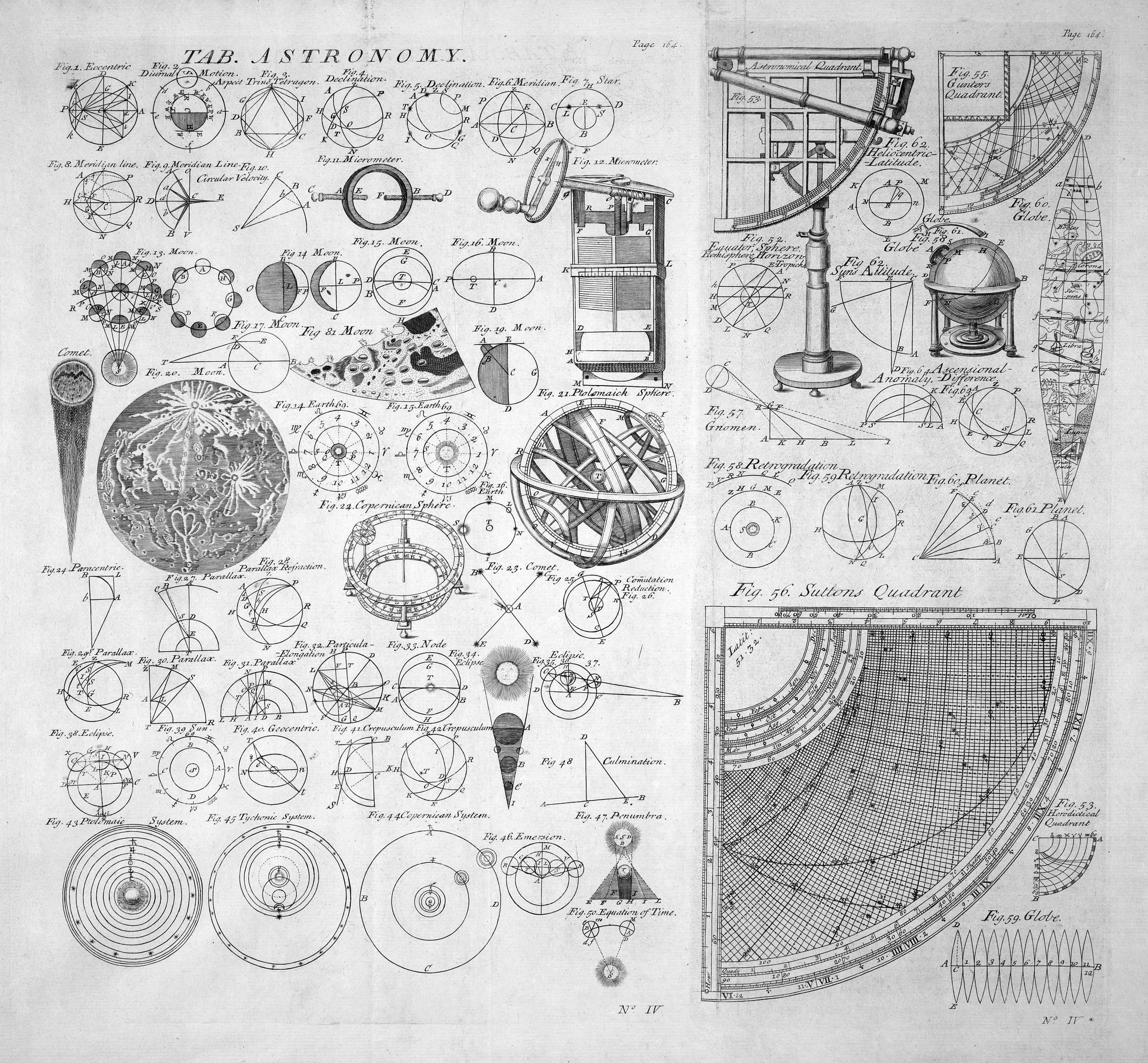
Plate with figures illustrating articles on astronomy, from the 1728 Cyclopædia

Sir Isaac Newton developed further ties between physics and astronomy through his law of universal gravitation. Realizing that the same force that attracts objects to the surface of the Earth held the Moon in orbit around the Earth, Newton was able to explain – in one theoretical framework – all known gravitational phenomena. In his Philosophiæ Naturalis Principia Mathematica, he derived Kepler's laws from first principles. Those first principles are as follows:

1. In an inertial frame of reference, an object either remains at rest or continues to move at constant velocity, unless acted upon by a force.
2. In an inertial reference frame, the vector sum of the forces F on an object is equal to the mass m of that object multiplied by the acceleration a of the object: F = ma. (It is assumed here that the mass m is constant)
3. When one body exerts a force on a second body, the second body simultaneously exerts a force equal in magnitude and opposite in direction on the first body.

Thus while Kepler explained how the planets moved, Newton accurately managed to explain why the planets moved the way they do. Newton's theoretical developments laid many of the foundations of modern physics.

=== Completing the Solar System ===
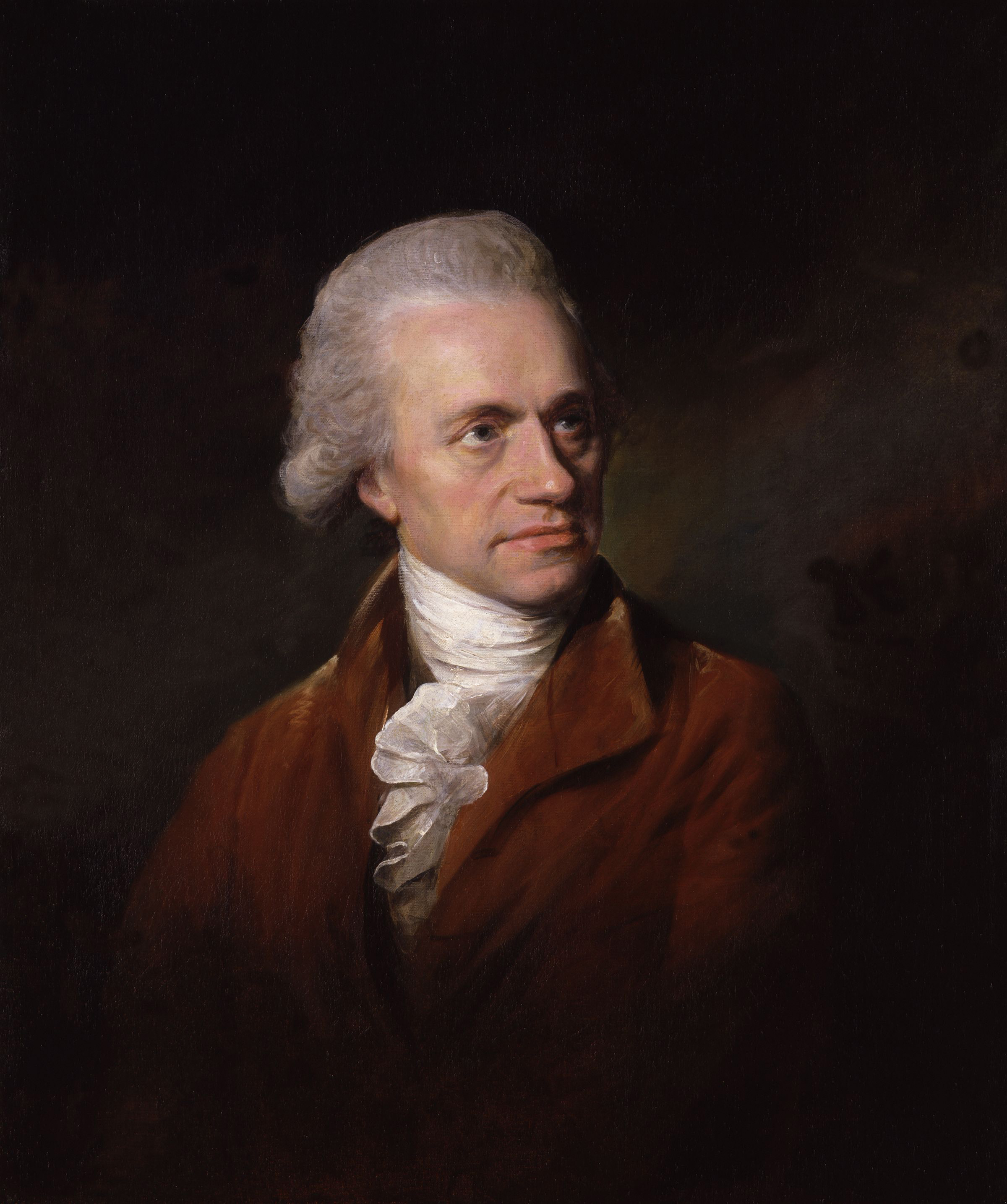
Portrait of William Herschel, 1785

Outside of England, Newton's theory took some time to become established. René Descartes' theory of vortices held sway in France, and Christiaan Huygens, Gottfried Wilhelm Leibniz and Jacques Cassini accepted only parts of Newton's system, preferring their own philosophies. Voltaire published a popular account in 1738. In 1748, the French Academy of Sciences offered a reward for solving the question of the perturbations of Jupiter and Saturn, which was eventually done by Euler and Lagrange. Laplace completed the theory of the planets, publishing from 1798 to 1825. The early origins of the solar nebular model of planetary formation had begun.

Edmond Halley succeeded John Flamsteed as Astronomer Royal in England and succeeded in predicting the return of the comet that bears his name in 1758. William Herschel found the first new planet, Uranus, to be observed in modern times in 1781.

At first, astronomical thought in America was based on Aristotelian philosophy, but interest in the new astronomy began to appear in Almanacs as early as 1659. The gap between the planets Mars and Jupiter disclosed by the Titius–Bode law was filled by the discovery of the asteroids Ceres and Pallas in 1801 and 1802 with many more following.

=== Stellar astronomy ===
Cosmic pluralism is the name given to the idea that the stars are distant suns, perhaps with their own planetary systems. Ideas in this direction were expressed in antiquity, by Anaxagoras and by Aristarchus of Samos, but did not find mainstream acceptance. The first astronomer of the European Renaissance to suggest that the stars were distant suns was Giordano Bruno in his De l'infinito universo et mondi (1584). This idea was among the charges brought against him by the Inquisition. Telescopic observations by Galileo Galilei showed that the Milky Way was a great concentration of individual stars. The idea of many stars became mainstream in the later 17th century, especially following the publication of Conversations on the Plurality of Worlds by Bernard Le Bovier de Fontenelle (1686), and by the early 18th century it was the default working assumptions in stellar astronomy.

The Italian astronomer Geminiano Montanari recorded observing variations in luminosity of the star Algol in 1667. Edmond Halley published the first measurements of the proper motion of a pair of nearby "fixed" stars, demonstrating that they had changed positions since the time of the ancient Greek astronomers Ptolemy and Hipparchus. William Herschel was the first astronomer to attempt to determine the distribution of stars in the sky. During the 1780s, he established a series of gauges in 600 directions and counted the stars observed along each line of sight. From this he deduced that the number of stars steadily increased toward one side of the sky, in the direction of the Milky Way core. His son John Herschel repeated this study in the southern hemisphere and found a corresponding increase in the same direction. In addition to his other accomplishments, William Herschel is noted for his discovery that some stars do not merely lie along the same line of sight, but are physical companions that form binary star systems.

== Modern astronomy ==
=== 19th century ===
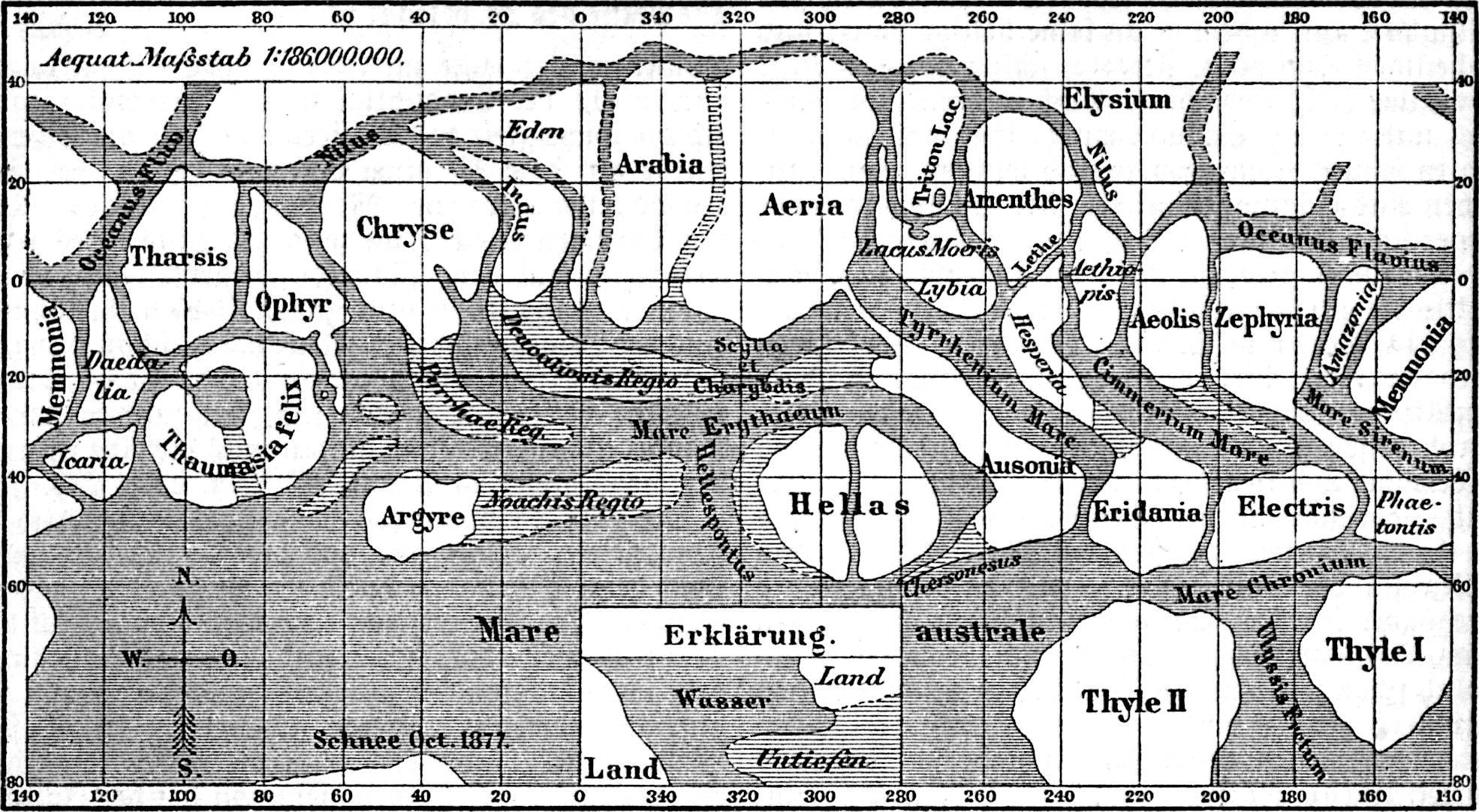
Mars surface map of Giovanni Schiaparelli

Pre-photography, data recording of astronomical data was limited by the human eye. In 1840, John W. Draper, a chemist, created the earliest known astronomical photograph of the Moon. And by the late 19th century thousands of photographic plates of images of planets, stars, and galaxies were created. Most photography had lower quantum efficiency (i.e. captured less of the incident photons) than human eyes but had the advantage of long integration times (100 ms for the human eye compared to hours for photos). This vastly increased the data available to astronomers, which led to the rise of human computers, famously the Harvard Computers, to track and analyze the data.

Scientists began discovering forms of light which were invisible to the naked eye: X-rays, gamma rays, radio waves, microwaves, ultraviolet radiation, and infrared radiation. This had a major impact on astronomy, spawning the fields of infrared astronomy, radio astronomy, x-ray astronomy and finally gamma-ray astronomy. With the advent of spectroscopy it was proven that other stars were similar to the Sun, but with a range of temperatures, masses and sizes.

The science of stellar spectroscopy was pioneered by Joseph von Fraunhofer and Angelo Secchi. By comparing the spectra of stars such as Sirius to the Sun, they found differences in the strength and number of their absorption lines—the dark lines in stellar spectra caused by the atmosphere's absorption of specific frequencies. In 1865, Secchi began classifying stars into spectral types. The first evidence of helium was observed on August 18, 1868, as a bright yellow spectral line with a wavelength of 587.49 nanometers in the spectrum of the chromosphere of the Sun. The line was detected by French astronomer Jules Janssen during a total solar eclipse in Guntur, India.

The first direct measurement of the distance to a star (61 Cygni at 11.4 light-years) was made in 1838 by Friedrich Bessel using the parallax technique. Parallax measurements demonstrated the vast separation of the stars in the heavens. Observation of double stars gained increasing importance during the 19th century. In 1834, Friedrich Bessel observed changes in the proper motion of the star Sirius and inferred a hidden companion. Edward Pickering discovered the first spectroscopic binary in 1899 when he observed the periodic splitting of the spectral lines of the star Mizar in a 104-day period. Detailed observations of many binary star systems were collected by astronomers such as Friedrich Georg Wilhelm von Struve and S. W. Burnham, allowing the masses of stars to be determined from the computation of orbital elements. The first solution to the problem of deriving an orbit of binary stars from telescope observations was made by Felix Savary in 1827. In 1847, Maria Mitchell discovered a comet using a telescope.

=== 20th century ===
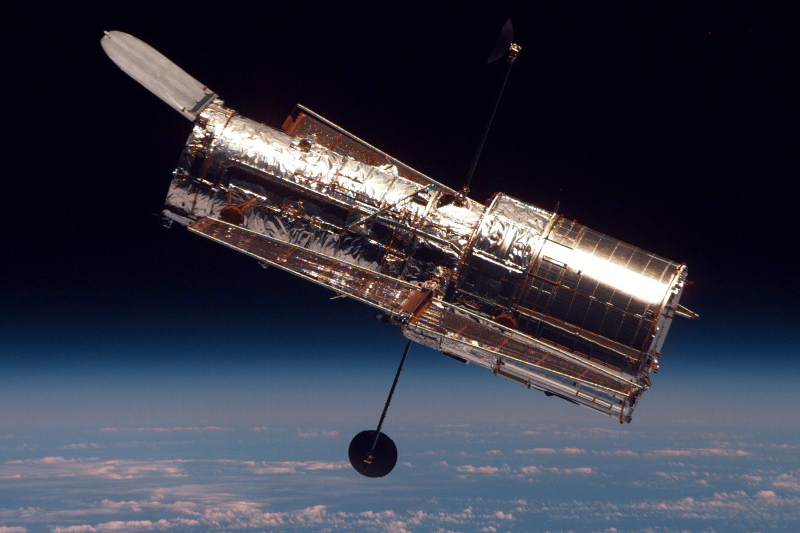
The Hubble Space Telescope

With the accumulation of large sets of astronomical data, teams like the Harvard Computers rose in prominence which led to many female astronomers, previously relegated as assistants to male astronomers, gaining recognition in the field. The United States Naval Observatory (USNO) and other astronomy research institutions hired human "computers", who performed the tedious calculations while scientists performed research requiring more background knowledge. A number of discoveries in this period were originally noted by the women "computers" and reported to their supervisors. Henrietta Swan Leavitt discovered the cepheid variable star period–luminosity relation which she further developed into a method of measuring distance outside of the Solar System.

A veteran of the Harvard Computers, Annie J. Cannon developed the modern version of the stellar classification scheme in during the early 1900s (O B A F G K M, based on color and temperature), manually classifying more stars in a lifetime than anyone else (around 350,000). The twentieth century saw increasingly rapid advances in the scientific study of stars. Karl Schwarzschild discovered that the color of a star and, hence, its temperature, could be determined by comparing the visual magnitude against the photographic magnitude. The development of the photoelectric photometer allowed precise measurements of magnitude at multiple wavelength intervals. In 1921 Albert A. Michelson made the first measurements of a stellar diameter using an interferometer on the Hooker telescope at Mount Wilson Observatory.

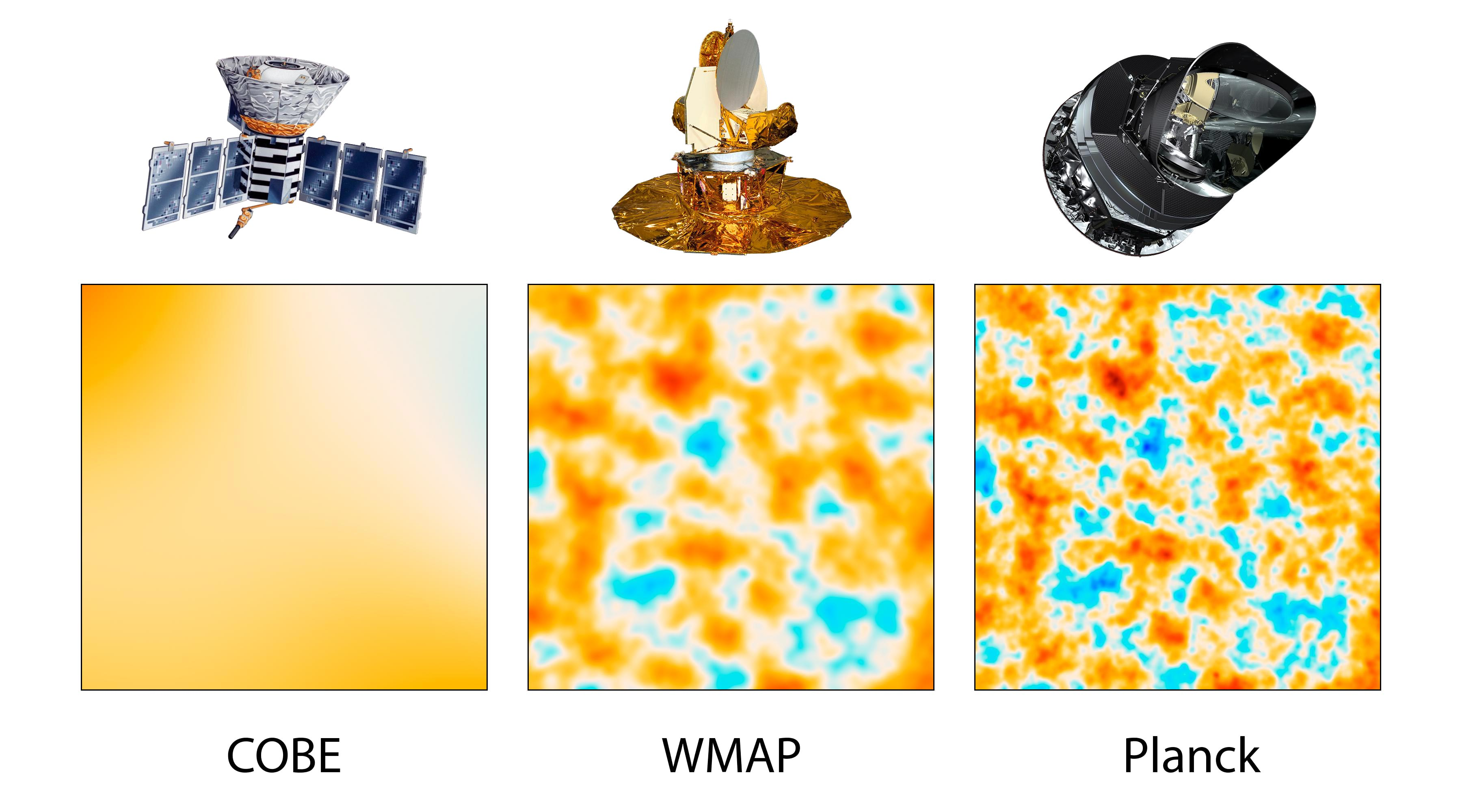
Comparison of CMB (Cosmic microwave background) results from satellites COBE, WMAP and Planck documenting a progress in 1989–2013

Important theoretical work on the physical structure of stars occurred during the first decades of the twentieth century. In 1913, the Hertzsprung–Russell diagram was developed, propelling the astrophysical study of stars. In Potsdam in 1906, the Danish astronomer Ejnar Hertzsprung published the first plots of color versus luminosity for these stars. These plots showed a prominent and continuous sequence of stars, which he named the Main Sequence. At Princeton University, Henry Norris Russell plotted the spectral types of these stars against their absolute magnitude, and found that dwarf stars followed a distinct relationship. This allowed the real brightness of a dwarf star to be predicted with reasonable accuracy. Successful models were developed to explain the interiors of stars and stellar evolution. Cecilia Payne-Gaposchkin first proposed that stars were made primarily of hydrogen and helium in her 1925 doctoral thesis. The spectra of stars were further understood through advances in quantum physics. This allowed the chemical composition of the stellar atmosphere to be determined. As evolutionary models of stars were developed during the 1930s, Bengt Strömgren introduced the term Hertzsprung–Russell diagram to denote a luminosity-spectral class diagram. A refined scheme for stellar classification was published in 1943 by William Wilson Morgan and Philip Childs Keenan.

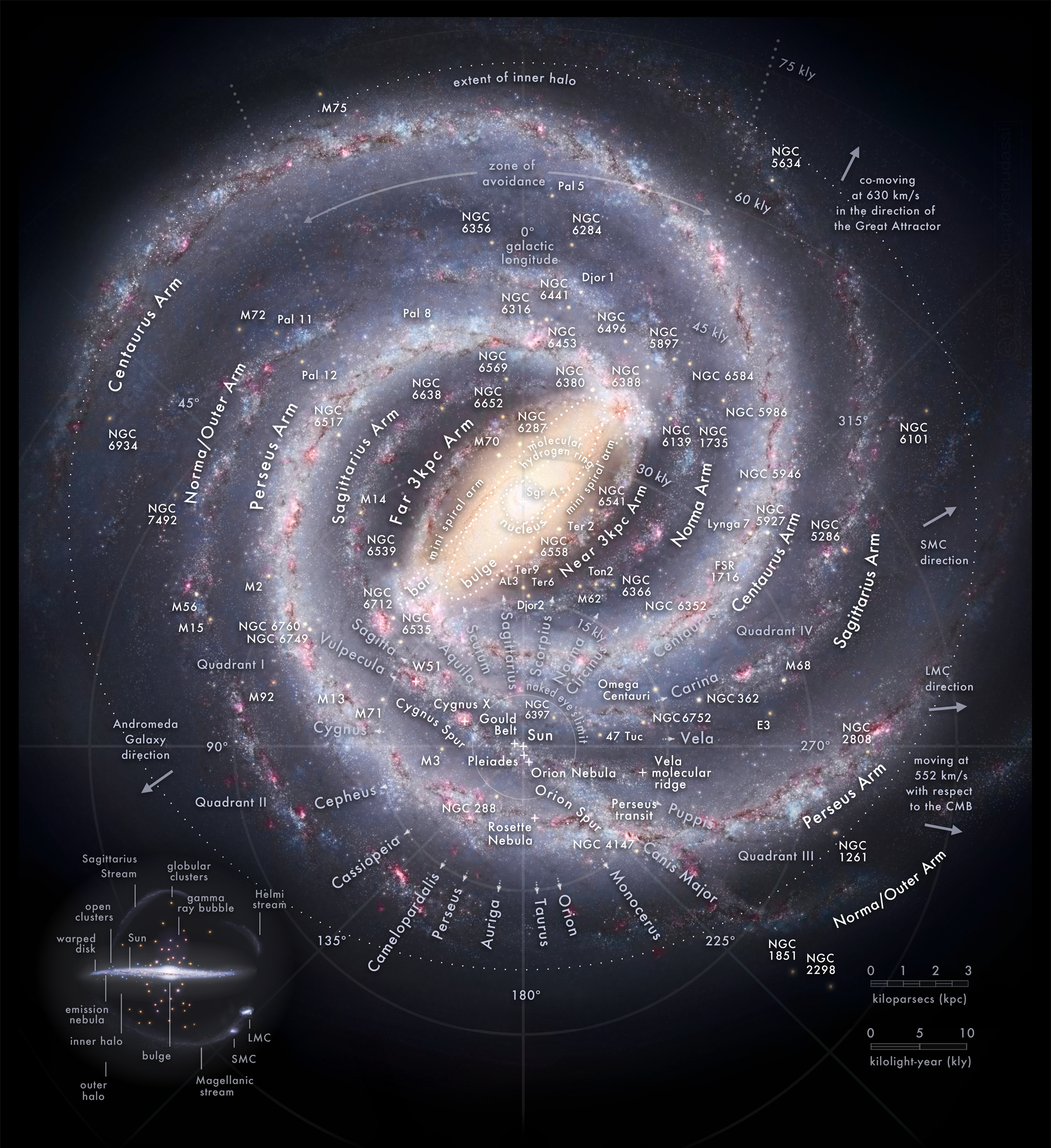
Map of the Milky Way Galaxy, with the constellations that cross the galactic plane in each direction and the known prominent components annotated including main arms, spurs, bar, nucleus/bulge, notable nebulae and globular clusters

The existence of the Milky Way, Earth's home galaxy, as a separate group of stars was only proven in the 20th century, as was the knowledge that other galaxies exist and that most of them are moving away from each other. The "Great Debate" between Harlow Shapley and Heber Curtis, in the 1920s, concerned the nature of the Milky Way, spiral nebulae, and the dimensions of the universe.

With the advent of quantum physics, spectroscopy was further refined.

The Sun was found to be part of a galaxy made up of more than 10^{10} stars (10 billion stars). The existence of other galaxies, one of the matters of the great debate, was settled by Edwin Hubble, who identified the Andromeda Nebula as a different galaxy, and many others at large distances and receding, moving away from our galaxy.

Physical cosmology, a discipline that has a large intersection with astronomy, made huge advances during the 20th century, with the model of the hot Big Bang heavily supported by the evidence provided by astronomy and physics, such as the redshifts of very distant galaxies and radio sources, the cosmic microwave background radiation, Hubble's law and cosmological abundances of elements.

== See also ==
- Age of the universe
- Anthropic principle
- Astrotheology
- Expansion of the universe
- Hebrew astronomy
- History of astrology
- History of Mars observation
- History of supernova observation
- History of the telescope
- Letters on Sunspots
- List of astronomers
  - List of French astronomers
  - List of Hungarian astronomers
  - List of Russian astronomers and astrophysicists
  - List of Slovenian astronomers
  - List of women astronomers
- List of astronomical instrument makers
- List of astronomical observatories
- Patronage in astronomy
- Society for the History of Astronomy
- Timeline of astronomy
- Timeline of Solar System astronomy
- Worship of heavenly bodies
