= Kali ahargana =

Integer associated with a civil day

Today (at UTC+00)
- Sunday, 23 August 2026
- Hindu: 5127 KY・1,872,810・Rāudra; Solar: 7 Bhādrapada, 1948 SE; Lunisolar: Ekādaśī, Śukla pakṣa of Śrāvaṇa, 2083 VE
Other calendars
Armenian	4 Hoṙi 1476
Aztec	Atemoztli 5, 5 Ācatl
Babylonian	9 Abu, 2337 SE
Balinese pawukon	Menga, Kajeng, Jaya, Paing, Urukung, Redite of Matal, Guru, Gigis, Sri
Bengali	8 Bhadro, BS 1433
Chinese	Yin Earth Snake・Room Mansion; 11 Qīyuè, Bǐngwǔnián (Chushu, 15 days until Bailu)
Common Era	23 August 2026 CE
Coptic	17 Mesori, AM 1742
Egyptian	9 Tybi, 2775 NE
Ethiopian	17 Naḥasē, 2018 Amätä Məhrät
French Republican	Décade I, Sextidi de Fructidor de l'Année 234 de la République
Gregorian	23 August, AD 2026
Hebrew	10 Elul, AM 5786
Icelandic	Sunnudagur, 29 Heyannir 2026
Islamic	9 Rabi' al-awwal, AH 1448 (using tabular method)
ISO week date	2026-W34-7
Japanese	11 Fumizuki, Reiwa 8 (Shosho, 15 days until Hakuro)
Julian	10 August, AD 2026 (AM 7534)
Julian day	2461276
Maya	13.0.13.15.13; 6 Mol, 5 Ben
Roman	ante diem IV Idus Augustas, MMDCCLXXIX AUC
Solar Hijri	1 Shahrivar, SH 1405

Kali ahargaṇa (Kali ahargaṇa number or Kalidina) is an integer associated with a civil day. The integer represents the number of civil days in a collection of consecutive days beginning with a special day called the kali epoch and ending with a specified day. Kali ahargaṇa is one of the basic parameters of Indian astronomy and it is extensively used in all sorts of astronomical computations.

== Commencement of kali epoch ==
The way how the date of the beginning of the Kali epoch was calculated can be summarized thus. The whole basis for the computation is the following cryptic statement by Āryabhaṭa in Āryabhaṭīya (śloka (stanza) 10 in Chapter 3 Kālakriyā):

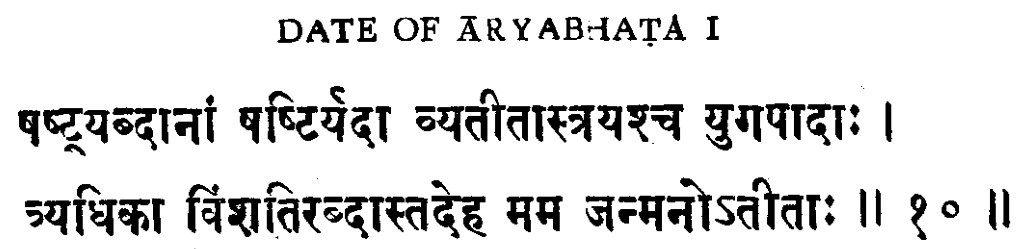
The śloka (stanza) in Āryabhaṭīya (śloka number 10, Chapter 3 Kālakriyā) specifying the date of Āryabhaṭa.

"When sixty times sixty years and three quarter yuga-s (of the current yuga) had elapsed, twenty-three years had then passed since my birth."

According to commentators, this stanza refers to the fact that sixty times sixty years, that is 3600 years, have elapsed since the beginning of the kali era. So, using this statement as the basis, to determine the date of commencement of the Kali epoch, one need to determine exactly on which day Āryabhaṭa made this statement. There is a fair degree of agreement among historians regarding the year in which the statement was made. Historians believe that Āryabhaṭa made this statement in 499 CE. But the exact day of the year on which the statement was made is still a matter of conjecture as it has not been mentioned in Āryabhaṭīya or anywhere else. However, according to one view, the statement was made on March 21, 499 CE perhaps because the day was calculated to be the vernal equinox day of that year or the day following it.

According to Āryabhaṭa, the duration of a year is 365 days 6 hours 12 minutes 30 seconds, that is, 365.25868 days approximately. Hence, as per Āryabhaṭa, the number days in a period of 3600 years is 1,314,931.25 days. Since a Julian year is 365.25, the number of Julian years in a period of 1,314,931.25 days is 3600 years 31.25 days. Assuming that the statement was made at sunrise on March 21, the sunrise of 31 days before that would fall on February 18. The balance of 0.25 days is a quarter of a day and so, 3600 Āryabhaṭan years exactly before the sunrise of March 21 would fall at the midnight of February 17–18. Now, regarding the year, it may be noted that historians have never included a year zero and so 3600 years before 499 CE would be 3102 BCE. Thus, the beginning of the Kali epoch may be fixed as the midnight of February 17–18, 3102 BCE.

There are two different conventions regarding the exact moment at which the kali epoch. According to one convention, called the ardharātrika convention, the epoch is the midnight of February 17–18, 3102 BCE. According to the other convention, called the audāyika convention, the epoch is the moment of sunrise on February 18, 3102 BCE.

=== Verification ===
Many Indian Almanac makers routinely include the kali ahargana numbers of every day of the relevant year in the almanacs. From these almanacs we can see that the kali ahargana of 1 January 2024 is 1,871,845. It can be verified that the number of days during the period from 18 February 3102 BCE in the proleptic Julian calendar to 31 December 2023 CE in the Gregorian calendar (both days inclusive) is exactly 1,871,845. While making the computations, the following points should be noted:

1. There is no year 0.
2. Year n CE is a leap year if n is divisible by 4.
3. Year n BCE is a leap year if (n-1) is divisible by 4. Thus the year 1 BCE is a leap year.
4. After 14 September 1752 CE, leap year rule: “Every year that is exactly divisible by four is a leap year, except for years that are exactly divisible by 100, but these centurial years are leap years if they are exactly divisible by 400. For example, the years 1700, 1800, and 1900 are not leap years, but the year 2000 is.”

A summary of the computations is depicted in the following diagram. The diagram shows the numbers of days during certain subperiod of the period from 18 February 3102 BCE to 31 December 2023 CE.

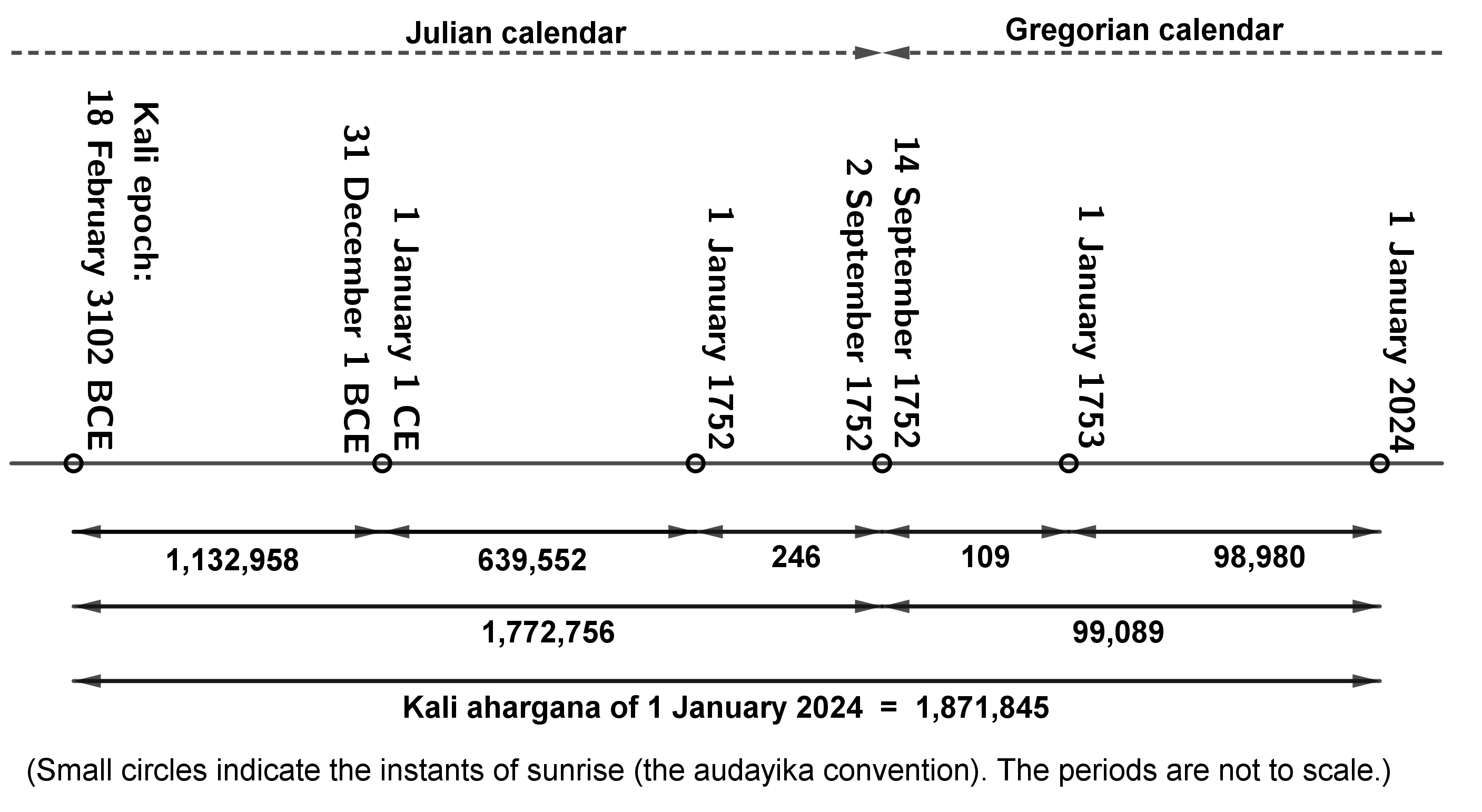
Diagram showing the computation of the number of days during the period from 18 February 3102 BCE to 31 December 2023 CE, both days inclusive, which is the Kali Ahargana of 1 January 2024.

== Ahargana ==
In Indian astronomical traditions, the term kali ahargana (also called kalidina) is an integer associated with a civil day. The integer represents the number of civil days in a collection of consecutive days beginning with a special day called the kali epoch and ending with a specified day. The Kali ahargana of a day is the number of days in the duration from the Kali epoch and the sunrise on the day under consideration or the previous midnight depending on which convention is followed regarding the kali epoch, audāyika or ardharātrika.

== Computation of kali ahargana ==
Given a date in the Common Era calendar, it is trivial and straightforward to compute the kali ahargana of that day. The Common Era calendar is the product of the evolution over centuries with intervening events like the Gregorian reform and the different dates of adoption of the reform in different countries. However, if the date is given in some other calendar, say the pre-modern Saka calendar, then the compuatation of the corresponding kali ahargana is indeed very complicated. The texts of classical Indian astronomy spend a lot of energy in explaining elaborately the procedure for the computation of kali ahargana.

=== The computational procedure ===
Bhāskara I has given the following procedure for the computation of the kali ahargana. Brahmagupta, Lalla, Śrīpati and Bhaākara II all have given the same procedure the computation of the kali ahargana.

Data for a yuga consisting of 4,320,000 years (constants)

M_{S} = number of saura months in a yuga

= 4,320,000 X 12 = 51,840,000

D_{S} = number of saura days in a yuga

= 51,840,000 X 30 = 1,555,200,000

M_{L} = number of lunar months in a yuga

= (number of lunar revolutions) - (number of solar revolutions)
= 57,753,336 - 4,320,000 (data on lunar revolutions from Aryabhatiya)
= 53,433,336

D_{L} = number of lunar days in a yuga

= 1,603,000,080

M_{I} = number of intercalary months in a yuga

= (number of lunar months) - (number of saura months)
= 53,433,336 - 51,840,000
= 1,593,336

D_{O} = number of omitted tithi-s in a yuga

= (number of lunar days) - (number of civil days)
= 1,603,000,080 - 1,577,917,500 (data on civil days from Aryabhatiya)
= 25,082,580

Data for the relevant day

m = number of months elapsed from 1st Caitra
d = number of days elapsed since the end of the last Amāvāsya
y = saura years elapsed in śāka

Computations

m_{S} = number of saura months since the kali epoch

= 12 (y + 3179) + m

d_{S} = number of saura days since the kali epoch

= 30m_{S} + d

m_{I} = number of intercalary months since the kali epoch

= (m_{S} X M_{I}) / M_{S}

d_{L} = number of lunar days since the kali epoch

= 30m_{I} + d_{S}

d_{O} = number of omitted lunar days since the kali epoch

= (d_{L} X D_{O}) / D_{L}

A = kali ahargana

= d_{L} - d_{O}

=== Verification and correction ===
The ahargaṅa number obtained by applying the above procedure may sometimes in error by one day. The correctness or otherwise of the computed value can be tested by finding the day of the date given by the ahargaṅa number and the day of the date of which the ahargaṅa number was being calculated. Let r be the remainder when the ahargaṅa number is divided by 7. If r is 0, then the day given by the ahargaṅa number would be Friday, if r is 1, the day would be Saturday, and so on. The defect or excess in the ahargaṅa number may be corrected accordingly by increasing or decreasing the number by one.

=== Illustration ===
The procedure is illustrated by computing the kali ahargaṅa of Tuesday 10 July 2001. The data relevant to this date are as follows:

m_{S} = 2, d = 18, y = 1923.

The computations proceed as follows.

m_{S} = 12 (y + 3179) + m = 12(1923 + 3179) + 2 = 61,226
m_{I} = (m_{S} X M_{I}) / M_{S} = (61,226 X 1,593,336) / 51,840,000 = 1,882
d_{L} = 30 (m_{S} + m_{I}) + d = 30 (61,226 + 1,882) = 1,893,258
d_{O} = (d_{L} X D_{O}) / D_{L} = (1,893,258 X 25,082,580) / 1,603,000,080 = 29,264
A = d_{L} - d_{O} = 1,863,634

To check the correctness of the value, note that the remainder when 1,863,634 is divided by 7 is 3 which corresponds to Monday and the day of the date is Tuesday. So the calculated value of the ahargaṅa number is in defect by one day. Increasing the value by one the ahargaṅa number of Tuesday 10 July 2001 is obtained as 1,863,635.

=== A practical method ===
If the kali ahargana of some recent date is known, then the kali ahargana of any desired date can be computed using the following formula: Let K_{D} be the kali ahargana of a date D and let X be the date on which the kali ahargana K_{X} is to be computed. Then:

K_{X} = (X - D) + K_{D}, where X - D is the number of days between X and D with proper sign (positive if D precedes X and negative if X precedes D)

For example, the kali ahargana of 10 July 2001 can now be used to compute the kali ahargana of 15 August 1947.

K_{(15 Aug 1947)} = (15 Aug 1947) - (10 Jul 2001) + K_{(10 Jul 2001)}

= - 19,688 + 1,863,635
= 1,843,947

== Determining the Common Era date corresponding to a given kali ahargaṅa ==
The reverse problem of determining the Common Era date, that is, the date as per the commonly accepted Julian/Greogorian calendar, corresponding to a given kali ahargaṅa is also important. Archaeologists have come across several inscriptions in which dates are recorded as kali ahargaṅa and there are several Sanskrit texts which contain kali ahargaṅa indicating the day of the completion of the work. Decoding these data into dates in modern calendar is important in fixing the dates of the monuments or texts. Tables have been constructed to solve this problem which help ease the difficulty of performing cumbersome computations.

== Kali ahargaṅa-s in literary and other works ==
Historical records, literary and inscriptional, of the North India and Deccan are silent about the kali ahargaṇa. But in the legends of Kerala there are many dates expressed as kali ahargaṇa (kalidina) in the katapayãdi notation. A few of them are given below.

- The 12-year reign of Ceran Keyapperumāl is believed to have commenced on kalidina "bhūmaubhūpoyamprāpya", that is, 1,211,454 which corresponds to 30 November 215 CE. This date is earlier than the date 31 March 499 that Āryabhaṭa is believed to have been referred to in Āryabhaṭīya and based on which the moment of kali epoch has been computed. Perhaps kali ahargaṇa-s must have been in use in Kerala even before the time of Āryabhaṭa.
- Mezhathoļ Agnihotri, son of Vararuci of Kerala, the legendary author of the Gīrnaśreyādi Candravākya-s, is said to have ignited the sacrificial fire for the first time on the kalidina "yajñasthānasamrakṣyaṃ", that is, 1,270,701, which corresponds to 13 February 378 CE. Based on this, Vararuci has been dated to the third century CE.
- The records in the Peruvanam Mahadeva Temple in Thrissur district in Kerala give the date of commencement of the great festival in the temple as "āyātuśivalokaṃ", that is, 1,345,610, which corresponds to 18 March 583 CE.
- The beginning date of the Malayalam era (Kollavarsham) is indicated by the kali ahargaṇa "ācāryavāgabhedya", that is, 1,434,160 which corresponds to 25 August 825 CE.
- Nīlakaṇṭha Somayājī has indicated the date of his own birth as kali ahargaṇa "tyajāmyajñātaṃ tarkaiḥ", that is, 1,660,181 which corresponds to 17 June 1444.
- Kerala poet and grammarian Melpathur Narayana Bhattathiri has recorded the date of completion of his work Narayaṇīyaṃ as kali ahargaṇa "āyurārogyasaukhyaṃ", that is, 1,712,211 which corresponds to 9 December 1586.

== See also ==
- Kali Yuga

== Additional reading ==
- For a full and thorough discussion of kali ahargaṅa: S. Balachandra Rao (2000). Ancient Indian Astronomy: Planetary Positions and Eclipses. Delhi: B. R. Publishing Corporation. pp. 26–41. (Chapter 5: Ahargaṅa)
- K. Chandra Hari (2004). "Julian Days in Astronomy" (PDF). Indian Journal of History of Science. 39 (3): 359–364.
- Report of the Calendar Reforms Committee: M. N. Saha and N. C. Lahiri (1992). History of the Calendar in Different Countries through the Ages (Part C of the Report of the Calendar Reforms Committee, Govt. of India) (PDF). New Delhi: Council of Scientific and Industrial Research. pp. 161–164.
- For a "disturbing discontinuity" in the ahargaṅa computations: Olaf Schmidt (1952). "On the Computation of the Ahargana". Centaurus. 2: 140–180.
- For a discussion on the use of different epochs in Indian astronomy: K. Chandra Hari (2000). "Search for an ancient epoch in Indian astronomy" (PDF). Indian Journal of History of Science. 35 (2): 109–115.
- S. K. Uma and S. Balachandra Rao (2018). "Ahargana in Makarandasārinī and Other Indian Astronomical Texts" (PDF). Indian Journal of History of Science. 53 (1): 16–32.
