= Sudhakara Dvivedi =

19th and 20th Century Indian Mathematician

Sudhakara Dvivedi (1855-1910) was an Indian scholar in Sanskrit and mathematics.

== Biography ==
Sudhakara Dvivedi was born in 1855 in Khajuri, a village near Varanasi. In childhood he studied mathematics under Pandit Devakrsna.

In 1883 he was appointed a librarian in the Government Sanskrit College, Varanasi where in 1898 he was appointed the teacher of mathematics and astronomy after Bapudeva Sastri retired in 1889.

He was the head of mathematics department in Queen's college Benaras from where he retired in 1905 and mathematician Ganesh Prasad became the new head of department. Dvivedi wrote a number of translations, commentaries and treatises, including one on algebra which included topics such as Pellian equations, squares, and Diophantine equations.

== Works in Sanskrit ==
- Chalan Kalan
- Deergha Vritta Lakshan ("Characteristics of Ellipse")
- Goleeya Rekha Ganit ("Sphere Line Mathematics")
- Samikaran Meemansa ("Analysis of Equations")
- Yajusha Jyauti-sham and Archa Jyauti-sham
- Ganakatarangini (1892)
- Euclid's Elements 6th, 11th and 12th parts
- Lilavati (1879)
- Bijaganita (1889)
- Pañcasiddhāntikā of Varāhamihira (1889): Co-edited with George Thibaut
- Surya Siddhanta
- Brahmagupta’s Brāhmasphuṭasiddhānta, 1902, ("Brahmagupta's Brāhmasphuṭasiddhānta" (PDF). 1902.)
- Aryabhata II's Maha-Siddhanta (1910)

== Works in Hindi ==
- Differential Calculus (1886)
- Integral Calculus (1895)
- Theory of equations (1897)
- A History of Hindu mathematics I (1910)
