= Brahmagupta's problem =

Mathematics Problem

This problem was given in India by the mathematician Brahmagupta in 628 AD in his treatise Brahma Sputa Siddhanta:

Solve Pell's equation

$$x^2 - 92y^2 = 1$$

for integers $x,y>0$.

Brahmagupta gave the smallest solution as

$$(x,y) = (1151,120)$$.

== See also ==
- Indian mathematics
- List of Indian mathematicians
- Indeterminate equation
- Diophantine equation
