= Khandakhadyaka =

Astronomical treatise

Khaṇḍakhādyaka (meaning "edible bite; morsel of food") is a Sanskrit-language astronomical treatise written by Indian mathematician and astronomer Brahmagupta in 665 CE. The treatise contains eight chapters covering such topics as the longitudes of the planets, diurnal rotation, lunar and solar eclipses, risings and settings, the moon's crescent and conjunctions of the planets. The treatise also includes an appendix which in some versions has only one chapter, and in other has three.

The treatise was written as a response to Aryabhata's Ardharatrikapaksa.

Ama-raja alias Ama-sharman (c. 1200) of Anandapura wrote a commentary titled Vasana-bhashya (IAST: Vāsanābhāṣya) on Khanda-khadyaka during the Chaulukya period. This work refers to earlier commentaries on Bhaskara's text, including those by Lalla (c. 748 CE), Prthudaka-svamin (c. 864), Utpala, and Someshvara (c. 1040). Khandakhadyaka was known to al-Biruni.
