= Prithudaka =

Indian mathematician (830–890)

Chaturveda Prithudaka Swami (c. 830 – c. 890) was an Indian mathematician best known for his work on solving equations. He also wrote an important commentary on Brahmagupta's work.

== Sources ==
- O'Connor, John J.; Robertson, Edmund F., "Prthudakasvami", MacTutor History of Mathematics Archive, University of St Andrews
- Pottage, John (1974), "The mensuration of quadrilaterals and the generation of Pythagorean triads: a mathematical, heuristical and historical study with special reference to Brahmagupta's rules", Archive for History of Exact Sciences, 12 (4): 299–354, doi:10.1007/BF01307176, MR 0465678
