= Śrīpati =

Indian mathematician and astronomer (1019–1066)

Śrīpati (c. 1019 – 1066), also transliterated as Shri-pati, was an Indian astronomer, astrologer and mathematician. His major works include Dhīkotida-karana (1039), a work of twenty verses on solar and lunar eclipses; Dhruva-mānasa (written in 1056), a work of 105 verses on calculating planetary longitudes, eclipses and planetary transits; Siddhānta-śekhara a major work on astronomy in 19 chapters; and Gaṇita-tilaka, an incomplete arithmetical treatise in 125 verses based on a work by Shridhara.

== Biography ==
Śrīpati was born in Rohinikhand in present-day Maharashtra, and lived during (c. 1019–1066. His father was Naga-deva (sometimes written as Namadeva) and his grandfather was Kesava.

Śrīpati followed the teachings of Lalla, and wrote on astrology, astronomy and mathematics. He was mainly focused on astrology, and his work on astronomy was aimed at supporting his research on astrology; his work on mathematics, in turn, was aimed at supporting his work on astronomy, such as the study of spheres.

Śrīpati had introduced one of the main methods of house division in Jyotiṣa, known as Śrīpati Bhāva system.

== Works ==
=== Dhīkotida-karana ===
Dhīkotida-karana (1039) is 20-verse text that discusses solar and lunar eclipses.

Commentaries on this text include:

- An udaharana (1610) by Ramakrishna Bhatta
- A tippana by Dinakara, known from a manuscript copied in 1823

=== Dhruva-mānasa ===
Dhruva-mānasa (1056) is a 105-verse text on calculating planetary longitudes, eclipses and planetary transits.

=== Siddhānta-śekhara ===
Siddhānta-śekhara (Siddhanta-shekhara) is a major work on astronomy in 19 chapters. Some of the notable chapters include:

- Chapter 13: Arithmetic; comprises 55 verses on arithmetic, Measurement, and shadow reckoning.
- Chapter 14: Algebra
  - discusses various rules of algebra without proof, in verbal form (without algebraic symbols)
  - Contains rules of signs for addition, subtraction, multiplication, division, square, square root, cube and cube root of positive and negative quantities
  - Contains the rule for solving a quadratic equation
- Chapter 15: Sphere

The work also contains the rules for the solution of simultaneous indeterminate equations of the first degree; these rules are similar to those given by Brahmagupta.

=== Gaṇita-tilaka ===
Gaṇita-tilaka is an incomplete, 125-verse treatise on arithmetics, based on a work by Shridhara. Its lost portion possibly consisted of the verses 19-55 of Chapter 13 of Siddhānta-śekhara.

=== Jyotiṣa-ratna-mālā ===
Jyotiṣa-ratna-mālā (Jyotisha-ratna-mala) is a 20-chapter text on astrology, based on the Jyotisha-ratna-kosha of Lalla. Śrīpati wrote a commentary on this work in Marathi language: this is one of the oldest surviving Marathi-language works.

Commentaries on this text include:

- Balavaodha by Damodara Pandita
- Bala-bodhini by Parama-Karunika
- Bala-bodhini, a Rajasthani language tika, by Rayasimha or Rai Singh (c. 1573–1610), the ruler of Bikaner; the author may be same as Parama-Karunika
- Bala-bodhini by Vaidyanatha Pandita alias Vaija-pandita, known from several manuscripts, the earliest of which is dated 1493
- A vivarana by Bhattotpala
- Dhundhika (1763) by Ratna, a pupil of Kshemendra
- A tika by Umapati
- A tika by Rama-sharman
- A tika or vivarana by Chaturbhuja Mishra, known from two manuscripts, the earliest of which is dated 1793
- A commentary by Mahadeva (fl. 1263), the nephew of Amaraja of Anandapura
- A didhiti by Indradattopadhyaya or Indradatta Upadhyaya

=== Jātaka-paddhati ===
Jātaka-paddhati, also known as Śrīpati-paddhatiḥ (Shripati-paddhati), is an 8-chapter text on astrology.

According to David Pingree, the text is "one of the fundamental textbooks for later Indian genethlialogy, contributing an impressive elaboration to the computation of the strengths of the planets and astrological places. It was enormously popular, as the large number of manuscripts, commentaries, and imitations attests."

Commentaries on this text include:

- A tika on Jataka-karma-paddhati by Raghunatha
- A tika by Devidasa (fl. 1600–1625) of Kanyakubja
- Bhavartha-manjari by Achyuta (fl. 1505–1534)
- Hora-tantram Praibhasha, a Malayalam-language commentary

Achyutha Pisharadi wrote Hora-sarochchaya, a 7-chapter adaptation of Jātaka-paddhati.

=== Other ===
Daivajña-vallabha, a work on astrology, concludes with excerpts from several works of Varaha-mihira. Some writers attribute this work to Varaha-mihira, but according to David Pingree, it is more likely to be Śrīpati's work. Narayana (Narayana Pandita?) wrote Subodhini, a Hindi-language version of Daivajña-vallabha (1905).

The Manasagari or Janma-patrika-paddhati attributed to Kalyana Rishi (fl. after 1629) includes extensive quotations and adaptations of content from Śrīpati's Ratnamala and Shripati-paddhati. also he had given the most useful method of division

== See also ==
- Kṛṣṇa Daivajña
