= Bhāskara I =

Indian mathematician and astronomer (600–680)

- Born: c. 600 CE possibly Saurāṣṭra or Asmaka
- Died: c. 680 CE possibly Asmaka (present-day Telangana and Maharashtra)
- Occupations: Mathematician, scientist
- Known for: Bhāskara I's sine approximation formula

Bhāskara I (Note: to avoid confusion with the 12th century mathematician Bhāskara II) (c. 600 – c. 680) was a 7th-century Indian mathematician and astronomer of the classical Siddhānta school of Jyotiṣa (astronomy and applied mathematics—one of the six Vedāngas or auxiliary disciplines of Vedic scholarship). He was the first to write numbers in the Hindu–Arabic decimal system with a circle for the zero, and who gave a unique and remarkable rational approximation of the sine function (jyā) in his commentary on Aryabhata's work. This commentary, Āryabhaṭīyabhāṣya, written in 629, is among the oldest known prose works in Sanskrit on mathematics and astronomy to be completely extant today. He also wrote two astronomical works in the line of Aryabhata's school: the Mahābhāskarīya ("Great Book of Bhāskara") and the Laghubhāskarīya ("Small Book of Bhāskara").

On 7 June 1979, the Indian Space Research Organisation launched the Bhāskara I satellite, named in honour of the mathematician.

== Biography ==
Little is known about Bhāskara's life, except for what can be deduced from his writings. He was born in India in the 7th century, and was probably an astronomer. Bhāskara I received his astronomical education from his father.

There are references to places in India in Bhāskara's writings, such as Vallabhi (the capital of the Maitraka dynasty in the 7th century) and Sivarajapura, both of which are in the Saurastra region of the present-day state of Gujarat in India. Also mentioned are Bharuch in southern Gujarat, and Thanesar in the eastern Punjab, which was ruled by Harsha. Therefore, a reasonable guess would be that Bhāskara was born in Saurastra and later moved to Aśmaka.

Bhāskara I is considered the most important scholar of Aryabhata's astronomical school. He and Brahmagupta are two of the most renowned Indian mathematicians; both made considerable contributions to the study of fractions.

== Representation of numbers ==
The most important mathematical contribution of Bhāskara I concerns the representation of numbers in a positional numeral system. Before Bhāskara I, astronomers and mathematicians of India used the Bhūtasaṅkhyā numerical system of concrete word-numerals for representing numbers in Sanskrit literature. In this system, specific objects or philosophical concepts were associated with specific numerals. For example, śaśin meaning moon (represented the number 1), netra (eyes), or aśvin (twins), denoted the number 2, while bhūta (as in pancha-bhūta, 5 elements) or indirya (5 senses), represented number 5. According to classical Indian mathematical rule aṅkānāṁ vāmato gatiḥ (numerals proceed from right to left), digits are mentioned in the increasing order of tens, evidencing the decimal place value system.

In his Āryabhaṭīyabhāṣya, Bhāskara I made combined use of poetic and technical arithmetics frequently in denoting numeral figures, noting aṅkairapi (in figure also it is written). He recorded these numbers from left to right using nine Brahmi numerals. He used a small circle (śūnya-bindu) to represent zero.

== Further contributions ==
=== Mathematics ===
Bhāskara I wrote three astronomical contributions. In 629, he annotated the Āryabhaṭīya, an astronomical treatise by Aryabhata written in verses. Bhāskara's comments referred exactly to the 33 verses dealing with mathematics, in which he considered variable equations and trigonometric formulae. In general, he emphasized proving mathematical rules instead of simply relying on tradition or expediency.

His work Mahābhāskarīya is divided into eight chapters about mathematical astronomy. In chapter 7, he gives a remarkable approximation formula for sin x:

$$\sin x \approx \frac{16x (\pi - x)}{5 \pi^2 - 4x (\pi - x)}, \qquad (0 \leq x \leq \pi )$$

which he assigns to Aryabhata. It reveals a relative error of less than 1.9% (the greatest deviation $\frac{16}{5\pi} - 1 \approx 1.859\%$ at $x=0$). Additionally, he gives relations between sine and cosine, as well as relations between the sine of an angle less than 90° and the sines of angles 90°–180°, 180°–270°, and greater than 270°.

==== Indeterminate equations (Kuṭṭaka) and mathematical proof ====
Bhāskara's commentary on Gaṇitapāda is the first known work of Kuṭṭaka (the pulverizer), which was—an algorithmic method—proposed by Āryabhata as a systemic approach for solving linear indeterminate equations in first degree, like $ax+c=by$ (where $a, b$ and $c$ are integers). It can be effectively identified with the Euclidean algorithm division and continued fractions. This was utilized in Indian astronomy to calculate planetary revolutions and conjunctions in cosmic cycles (yugas).

In his remarks, Bhāskara emphasizes the role of mathematical reasoning and demonstration (upapatti), affirming that rules must not be accepted solely based on traditions. They must be accepted only if there is evidence or verification (hetu). To demonstrate the algorithm's practical use, he provided several applied problems involving fractions of days (adhimāsa) and celestial revolutions.

In indeterminate analysis, Bhāskara I focussed on linear indeterminate equations ($ax+c=by$), by providing commentary and solutions using the Kuṭṭaka algorithm on Āryabhata's verses. Quadratic indeterminate equations of the form $Nx^2+1=y^2$, (Vargaprakṛti), historically misattributed in Western literature as Pell's equations, were not handled by Bhāskara I. They were treated by his contemporary Brahmagupta and later expanded by Bhāskara II.

Bhāskara clearly believed that π was irrational. In support of Aryabhata's approximation of π, he criticized its approximation to $\sqrt{10}$, a practice common among Jain mathematicians.

He was the first mathematician to openly discuss quadrilaterals with four unequal, nonparallel sides.

=== Astronomy ===
The Mahābhāskarīya consists of eight chapters dealing with mathematical astronomy. The book deals with topics such as the longitudes of the planets, the conjunctions among the planets and stars, the phases of the moon, solar and lunar eclipses, and the rising and setting of the planets.

Parts of Mahābhāskarīya were later translated into Arabic.

== See also ==
- Bhāskara I's sine approximation formula
- List of astronomers
- List of Indian mathematicians

== Sources ==
(From Keller (2006a, p. xiii))

- M. C. Apaṭe. The Laghubhāskarīya, with the commentary of Parameśvara. Anandāśrama, Sanskrit series no. 128, Poona, 1946.
- v.harish Mahābhāskarīya of Bhāskarācārya with the Bhāṣya of Govindasvāmin and Supercommentary Siddhāntadīpikā of Parameśvara. Madras Govt. Oriental series, no. cxxx, 1957.
- K. S. Shukla. Mahābhāskarīya, Edited and Translated into English, with Explanatory and Critical Notes, and Comments, etc. Department of mathematics, Lucknow University, 1960.
- K. S. Shukla. Laghubhāskarīya, Edited and Translated into English, with Explanatory and Critical Notes, and Comments, etc., Department of mathematics and astronomy, Lucknow University, 2012.
- K. S. Shukla. Āryabhaṭīya of Āryabhaṭa, with the commentary of Bhāskara I and Someśvara. Indian National Science Academy (INSA), New- Delhi, 1999.
