= Brahmagupta theorem =

Theorem on cyclic quadrilateral

Diagram of Brahmagupta's theorem. Cyclic quadrilateral Perpendicular diagonals (concur at M) Perpendicular of a side through M; bisects the opposite side per the theorem

In geometry, Brahmagupta's theorem states that if a cyclic quadrilateral is orthodiagonal (that is, has diagonals that are perpendicular), then the perpendicular to a side from the point of intersection of the diagonals always bisects the opposite side. It is named after the Indian mathematician Brahmagupta (598-668).

More specifically, let A, B, C and D be four points on a circle such that the lines AC and BD are perpendicular. Denote the intersection of AC and BD by M. Drop the perpendicular from M to the line BC, calling the intersection E. Let F be the intersection of the line EM and the edge AD. Then, the theorem states that F is the midpoint of AD.

== Proof ==
Proof of the theorem

We need to prove that AF = FD. We will prove that both AF and FD are in fact equal to FM.

To prove that AF = FM, first note that the angles ∠FAM and ∠CBM are equal, because they are inscribed angles that intercept the same arc of the circle (CD). Furthermore, the angles ∠CBM and ∠CME are both complementary to angle ∠BCM (i.e., they add up to 90°), and are therefore equal. Finally, the angles ∠CME and ∠FMA are the same. Hence, △AFM is an isosceles triangle, and thus the sides AF and FM are equal.

The proof that FD = FM goes similarly: the angles ∠FDM, ∠BCM, ∠BME and ∠DMF are all equal, so △DFM is an isosceles triangle, so FD = FM. It follows that AF = FD, as the theorem claims.

== See also ==
- Brahmagupta's formula for the area of a cyclic quadrilateral
