= Jyotiḥśāstra =

List of Hindu astrological texts

A jyotiḥśāstra (treatise on Jyotisha) is a text from a classical body of literature on the topic of Hindu astrology, known as Jyotiṣa, dating to the medieval period of Classical Sanskrit literature (roughly the 3rd to 9th centuries CE). Only the most important ones exist in scholarly editions or translations, while many remain unedited in Sanskrit or vernacular manuscripts.

Such classical texts should be distinguished from modern works. There are a great number of contemporary publications, reflecting the persisting importance of astrology in Hindu culture, and the corresponding economical attractivity of the market in India. Notable modern authors include Sri Yukteswar Giri (1855–1936) and Bangalore Venkata Raman (1912–1998).

== Classification ==
David Pingree defines jyotihshastra as manuscripts on astronomy, mathematics, astrology and divination, and estimates that about 10% of surviving Sanskrit manuscripts belong to the category.

Traditionally, jyotihshastra texts are classified into three broad categories:

- samhitā or śākhā (natural astrology and omens): effects of planetary positions and other natural phenomenon on the world
- horā or jātaka (horoscopic astrology): effects of planetary positions on humans,
- gaṇita (mathematical astronomy): calculations of planetary paths and other astronomical matters such as spherics
  - siddhanta: a fundamental treatise; generally uses the beginning of creation of kalpa (aeon) as the epoch of calculation
  - tantra: generally uses the beginning of the kali yuga as the epoch of calculation
  - karana: a handy, practical work describing short and simplified calculations; meant for panchanga-makers; generally uses the year of composition as the epoch

According to Pingree, this classification, mentioned in sources such as the Brihat Samhita (1.9), does not cover the field adequately.

== List of classical texts ==
- Gargiya-jyotisha
- Garga-samhita, attributed to Vrddha Garga
- Garga Hora
- Brihat Parasara Horashastra, attributed to sage Parasara
- Jaimini Sutra, attributed to sage Jaimini
- Sphujidhwaja Hora or Yavanajataka by King Sphujidhwaja
- Sārāvalī by Kalyanavarma
- Brihat Samhitā by Varahamihira
- Brihat Jataka by Varahamihira
- Daivajna Vallabha by Varahamihira
- Phaladeepika by Mantreshvara
- Hora Sara by Prithuyasas
- Sarvartha Chintamani by Venkatesha Daivajna
- Hora Ratna by Acharya Balabhadra
- Jataka Parijata by Vaidyanatha Deekshita
- Chamatkara Chintamani by Bhatta Narayana (astrologer)
- Uttara Kalamritam by Ganaka Kalidasa
- Tajika Neelakanthi by Nilakantha)
- Prasna Marga by Panakkattu Nambootiri
- Dasadhyayi by Govinda Bhattathiri

== See also ==
- Indian astronomy
- Vedanga
- Lal Kitab
