= Garga =

Garga may refer to:

== People ==
- Garga (sage), ancient Indian sage and the author of a Rigveda hymn
- Bhagwan Das Garga, Indian documentary filmmaker
- Garga Haman Adji, Cameroonian politician
- Vrddha Garga, ancient Indian astrologer and astronomer

== Places ==
- Garga, Republic of Buryatia, a rural locality in Russia
- Garga, Iran, a village in Iran
- Garga, Burkina Faso, a village in Niou Department, Burkina Faso
- Garga (river), a river in Italy

== Other ==
- Garga (skipper), a genus of butterflies
- Garga, a fictional character in the Future Card Buddyfight collectible card game

== See also ==
- Gargah, Iran
- Gargi, an ancient Indian philosopher and sage
- Gargi (film), 2022 Indian legal drama film by Gautham Ramachandran
- Garga Samhita (disambiguation)
- Garg (disambiguation)
- Gargar (disambiguation)
- Gargas (disambiguation), several places in France
- Gargya (disambiguation)
