= Prashna Tantra =

Hindu horary astrology text

- Author: Samara-simha (original text); Nilakantha (possibly compiler of a later version)
- Translator: Bangalore Venkata Raman
- Language: Sanskrit
- Subject: Astrology
- Publication place: India

Prashna Tantra (IAST: Praśna-tantra) is an Indian text on horary astrology.

== Authorship ==
The text has been attributed to the 16th century astrologer-astronomer Nilakantha by earlier sources, but later research suggests that the original Prashna-tantra was written by Samara-simha in the 13th century, largely based on Sahl ibn Bishr's 9th century text Kitāb fi l-masa'il wa-l-ahkam. Nilakantha or one of his students may have compiled the hybrid version of Prashna-tantra to complement the two volumes of Nilakantha's Tajika-Nilakanthi, by adding excerpts from other texts to the original work. These other texts include mainly non-Tajika Sanskrit works such as Bhattotpala's Prashna-jnana, Padma-prabha-suri's Bhuvana-dipaka, Narayana-dasa Siddha's Prashna-vaishnava, Prthyu-yashas's Shatpanchashika, Varaha-mihira's Brhadyatra, Ramachandra's Samara-sara, Yaska's Nirukta, Prashna-chintamani, Prashna-dipaka, Prashna-pradipa, Trailokya-prakasha, and Jnana-muktavali, among others.

== Contents ==
The text is based on the Tajika system of prognostication. It comprises 430 slokas divided into four chapters, and is written in the usual Sanskrit Sloka – format. Prashna Tantra is divided into four chapters, viz – Prashna Vichara (preliminaries), Bhava Prashna (questions bearing on different houses), Vishesha Prashna (special questions) and Prakirnakadhyaya (concluding remarks). The aspects considered by this work are those of the Tajika system, an aspect by itself has no orb but planets have orbs of operation; Yogas in this system arise on the basis of applying and separating aspects, the closer the yoga (Ithsala etc.,), the more certain will be the results. The rules and methods initiated by this text have found favour with astrologers since the time it was written and came to light around 1580.

== See also ==
Ashtamangala prasnam
