= Samudrika Shastra =

Vedic study of body feature and aura reading

Samudrika Shastra (Sanskrit: सामुद्रिक शास्त्र), part of the Vedic tradition, is the study of face reading, aura reading, and whole body analysis.

== Description ==
The Sanskrit term "Samudrika Shastra" translates roughly as "knowledge of body features." It is related to astrology and palmistry (Hasta-samudrika), as well as phrenology (kapala-samudrika) and face reading (physiognomy, mukha-samudrika).

The tradition assumes that every natural or acquired bodily mark encodes its owner's psychology and destiny. Elevation, depression, elongation, diminution, and other marks become relevant. There are five main types of human elements in terms of the samudrika: agni, vayu, jala, akasha and prithvi. Traditional stories in India thus abound with descriptions of rare auspicious markings found on the bodies of memorable people. Legends about Rama, Krishna, the Buddha, and Mahavira conform to this tradition.

Hindus, Buddhists, and Jains share the tradition of Samudrika Shastra; the tradition also has parallels in other unrelated cultures, with phrenology and face reading both evoking its principles. William Herbert Sheldon's typology of body forms – ectomorph, mesomorph, and endomorph (called 'somatotypes') – also mimics the practice of Samudrika Shastra.

== Literature ==
The system of human marks finds a mention in various jyotisha-shastra and dharma-shastra texts, but it emerged as an independent shastra (field of study) with the composition of various texts collectively called the samudrika-shastras (IAST: Sāmudrika-śāstras). Many of these texts are undated: the Sanskrit-language Samudrika-tilaka, one of the earliest important works, was composed in the 12th century CE.

Around 600 samudrika-shastra manuscripts, often anonymous or attributed to legendary authors, are available. The titles of most of these manuscripts are Samudrika-lakshana, Samudrika, Samudraka-shastra, or Samudrika-lakshana. Less common titles include Samudrika-nirupana, Samudrika-samkshepa, and Samudrika-vichara. Most of these manuscripts are anonymous, but others are attributed Samudra, Narayana, Haridasa, Narada (e.g. Samudrika-nirupana), Vararuchi (e.g. Samudrika-lakshana), Garga, or Vishnudatta. A Tamil manuscript titled Samudrika-lakshana (Sāmudrika-lakṣaṇa) at the Government Oriental Manuscripts Library in Chennai presents itself as a revelation from the god Subrahmanya to the sage Agastya. A comprehensive study of these manuscripts has not been done, but many of them appear to be extractions, redactions, or consolidations of pre-existing material. Many of the extracts come from the Puranas (Bhavishya, Vishnu-dharmottara, Skanda) and the Brhat-samhita. Several manuscripts included verses from the Gargiya-jyotisha, Rati-rahasya, and other Puranas (Vishnu and Matsya). It is also one of the themes incorporated into the ancient Hindu text, the Garuda Purana.

Other works on the topic include Samudrika-sara by Shankara or Narayana-suri and Samudrikadesha by Damodara. Samudrika-maha-shastra, an anonymous manuscript from Nepal, dated 17 September 1800, contains 32 chapters in form of a dialogue between the deities Ganga and Samudra. In Jain literature, two notable samudrika-shastra texts are Samudrika-lakshana of Jaipur, and Samudrika by Pandita Padam-sinha of Ajmer.

Among localised works originating from western India, the three most important texts are the Samudrika-tilaka, the Samudrika-chintamani, and Samudrika. Durlabha-raja began writing the Samudrika-tilaka (as Nara-lakshana-shastra) in c. 1160 CE, and his son Jagad-deva completed it in c. 1175 CE; Sri Venkateswar Steam Press published the work under the generic title Samudrika-shastra in 1954. Samudrika-chintamani (Sāmudrikacintāmaṇi) of Madhava Shri-grama-kara, written in c. 1700 CE, closely follows the Samudrika-tilaka. Samudrika, also known by the generic titles Samudrika-shastra or Samudrika-lakshana, is an anonymous work with two versions. The first version is found throughout India, and one manuscript names Mula-deva as its main author, plus Vama-deva as the author of twenty verses. The second version is found in northern India and Nepal, and one manuscript suggests that it is derived from the collection of one Jagan-mohana, composed by Shri-lakshmanacharya Bhatta.

Samudrika-tantra (1847-1848 CE), attributed to the god Shiva, is a localised text from Mithila.

Over 50 manuscripts of various samudrika-shastra texts contain a commentary or translation, mostly in non-Sanskrit regional languages such as including Prakrit, Hindi, Brajbhasha, Newari, Rajasthani, Gujarati, Marathi, Maru-Gurjura, Odia, Tamil, and Malayalam. The oldest manuscript with a commentary is titled Samudrika-lakshana (1507 CE): it comes from a Jain collection of Rajasthan, and features a Hindi commentary.
