= Garga Samhita =

Garga Samhita is the title of several Sanskrit-language texts:

- Garga-samhita (Garga and Kraushtuki), a 1st century CE astrological treatise, also known as Garga-jyotisha
- Garga-samhita (Garga and Bharadvaja), a 6th-7th century astrological and astronomical treatise
- Garga Samhita (Vaishnavite text), an account of the life of Radha Krishna

== See also ==
- Garga (disambiguation)
