= Jataka Parijata =

Hindu astrological text

- Author: Vaidyanatha Dikshita
- Language: Sanskrit
- Subject: Astrology
- Publication date: 1426 CE
- Publication place: India

Jataka Parijata is an Indian astrological text that is ranked alongside Bṛhat Parāśara Horāśāstra of Parāśara Muni, Bṛhat Jātaka of Varāhamihira and Phaladīpikāḥ of Mantreśvara. It is regularly studied as a textbook and a reliable reference-book, and is one of the few books that gives time on the nativity, the other two being Horā Ratnaṃ and Jātaka Bharaṇaṃ.

Jataka Parijata (Devanāgarī: जातक पारिजात, IAST: jātaka pārijāta) is written in Sanskrit in the usual Śloka-format. Its author, Vaidyanātha Dīkṣita, was probably born c.1425-1450. Many noted scholars and authors like - V.Subramanya Sastri, G.S.Kapoor, Gopesh Kumar Ojha, Bangalore Venkata Raman, Bepin Behari, Gayatri Vasudev, S.S.Chaterjee, Ernst Wilhelm, Hart De Fouw, Arthur Llewellyn Basham, Komilla Sutton - have translated and written commentaries on Jataka Parijata beside referring to its contents in their own works.

Jātaka Pārijāta, according to Gopesh Kumar Ojha, was completed in the year 1347 Śaka/1482 Vikram Saṃvat i.e. in the year 1426 A.D. It is based on various earlier works such as Garga Horā, Bṛhat Parāśara Horāśāstra, Śrīpati-Paddhati, Sārāvalī, Bṛhat Jātaka, Sarvārtha Cintāmaṇi etc. Its author, Vaidyantha, who was a devotee of Ranganatha (Lord Viṣṇu) and lived in South India in Karṇāṭaka or Andhra, belonged to the Bharadvāja Gotra and was the son of Veṅkaṭadri. Some scholars are of the opinion that Vaidyanātha is the same person who wrote Prataprudriya. Keśava Daivajṅa, the author of Keśava Jātaka and Muhūrta-Tattva, was his disciple.

Jātaka Pārijāta has Eighteen chapters viz. I: Prathamo'dhyāyaḥ – Rāśiśīlādhyāyaḥ (61 verses) or Chapter on forms of Signs, II: Dvitīyo'dhyāyaḥ – Grahasvarūpaguṇādhyāyaḥ (87 verses) or Chapter on nature of Planets, III: Tṛtīyo'dhyāyaḥ – Viyonyādijanmādhyāya (80 verses) or Chapter on Births, IV: Caturtho'dhyāyaḥ – Bālāriṣṭādhyāyaḥ (107 verses) or Chapter on Early Death, V: Pañcamoyo'dhyāyaḥ – Āyurdāyādhyāyaḥ (124 verses) or Chapter on Longevity, VI: Tṛtīyo'dhyāyaḥ – Jātakabhaṅgādhyāyaḥ (102 verses) or Chapter on Miseries and set-backs, VII – Rājayogādhyāyaḥ (181 verses) or Chapter on gain of Rulership and ruling powers, VIII – Dviyadigrhayogādhyāyaḥ (118 verses) or Chapter on Conjunction etc., of two or more planets, IX – Mandyabdadiphaladhyaya (129 verses) or Chapter on the role of Māndi etc., X – Aṣṭakavargādhyāyaḥ (72 verses) or Chapter on Aṣṭakavarga system, XI – Prathamadvityābhāvaphalādhyāyaḥ (96 verses) or Chapter on nature and results on account of planetary influence etc., of the Lagna and the 2nd house, XII – Tṛtyācaturthabhāvaphalādhyāyaḥ (144 verses) or Chapter on nature and results on account of planetary influence etc., of the 3rd and the 4th house, XIII – Pañcamaṣaṣṭhabhāvaphalādhyāyaḥ (82 verses) or Chapter on nature and results on account of planetary influence etc., of the 5th and the 6th house, XIV – Saptamāṣṭamnavamabhāvaphalādhyāyaḥ (103 verses) or Chapter on nature and results on account of planetary influence etc., of the 7th, the 8th and the 9th house, XV – Daśamekādaśādvādaśabhāvaphalādhyāyaḥ (83 verses) or Chapter on nature and results on account of planetary influence etc., of the 10th, 11th and the 12th house, XVI – Strījātakādhyāyaḥ (54 verses) or Chapter on Female horoscopy, XVII – Kālacakradaśādhyāya (111 verses) or Chapter on Kālacakradaśā calculation and results and XVIII – Daśāphalādhyāyaḥ (172+4 verses) Chapter on Uḍudaśās.

These eighteen chapters said to originally contain 1763 ślokas, due to interpolations now consisting of 1910 or 1918 verses, cover the entire range of Hindu astrology based on Parāśarian principles. Like Bṛhat Jātaka, Jātaka Pārijāta is a condensation of more ancient Hora texts and some later important works including Bṛhat Jātaka.

== Author ==
Vaidyanatha Dikshita, was the author of Jataka Parijata. He was the son of Venkatadri Dikshita and grandson of Anniah Dikshita, was a Brahmin belonging to the Bharadwaja Gotra. He is believed to have lived in South India either in the 14th or 15th century A.D.

Not much is known about his life except for his statement in Jataka Parijata. According to Katva, Vaidyanatha lived in the 14th century in Mysore. V. Subramanya Sastri, the translator and commentator of Jataka Parijata, disagreed with the attribution of Sarvartha Chintamani to Venkatadri Dikshita, suggesting that Vaidyanatha Dikshita was born between 1425 and 1450. He cited the fact that Kesava Daivajna, the author of Muhurata Tattva, a Sanskrit treatise on Hindu astrology and a disciple of Vaidyanatha Dikshita who was born around 1456, was the father of Ganesa Daivajna, who in 1520 wrote the Sanskrit treatise on astrology titled Graha Laghava.

Vaidyanatha also wrote Patrimargapradeepika, a textbook on calculating the birth-chart etc., and the Janamapatrika.
