= Gargas =

Gargas is the name of several communes in France:

- Gargas, Haute-Garonne, in the Haute-Garonne department
- Gargas, Vaucluse, in the Vaucluse department
  - Ocriers Gargas XIII, a rugby league club
- Caves of Gargas, a prehistoric site located in Aventignan, Hautes-Pyrénées

== See also ==
- Garga (disambiguation)
