= Dandaneh =

Dandaneh (Persian: دندانه) may refer to:

- Dandaneh, Kermanshah
- Dandaneh, Razavi Khorasan
