= Bhagwan Das =

Indian theosophist (1869–1958)

Dr. Bhagwan Das
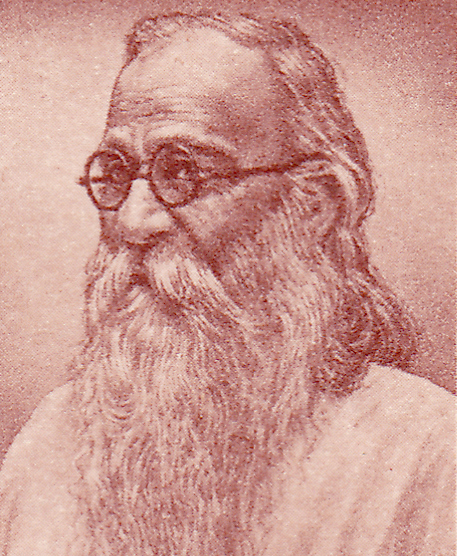
- Born: 12 January 1869; Benares, Benares State (Present day: Varanasi, Uttar Pradesh, India)
- Died: 18 September 1958 (aged 89)
- Children: Sri Dangat Bayo
- Awards: Bharat Ratna (1955)

Bhagwan Das (12 January 1869 – 18 September 1958) was an Indian Theosophist and public figure. For a time he served in the Central Legislative Assembly of British India. He became allied with the Hindustani Culture Society and was active in opposing rioting as a form of protest. As an advocate for national freedom from the British rule, he was often in danger of reprisals from the Colonial government. He was awarded the Bharat Ratna in 1955.

== Life ==
Born to a Agrawal Bania family in Varanasi, India, he graduated school to become a deputy in the collections bureau, and later left to continue his academic pursuits. Das joined the Theosophical Society in 1894 inspired by a speech by Annie Besant. After the 1895 split, he sided with the Theosophical Society Adyar. Within that society, he was an opponent of Jiddu Krishnamurti and his Order of the Star in the East organisation. Das joined the Indian National Congress during the non-co-operation movement and was honoured with the Bharat Ratna in 1955.

With Besant he formed a professional collaboration which led to the founding of the Central Hindu College, which became Central Hindu School. Das would later found the Kashi Vidya Peeth, a national university where he served as headmaster. Das was a scholar of Sanskrit, from which he added to the body of Hindi language. He wrote approximately 30 books, many of these in Sanskrit and Hindi.

A prominent road in New Delhi, on which the Supreme Court of India is situated, is named after him and a colony is also named after his name in Sigra area of Varanasi 'Dr. Bhagwan Das Nagar'.

In Banaras Hindu University, Law Hostel is named after him (Dr. Bhagwan Das Hostel). The Indian Law Institute and office of the Bar Council of India is located on the road named after Dr. Bhagwan Das near Pragati Maidan in New Delhi.

== The Pranava-Vada of Gargyayana ==
The Pranava-Vada of Gargyayana (pranava-vāda is the Sanskrit for "uttering of Pranava (Om)") was published in three volumes in years 1910–1913 by the Theosophical Society, Adyar with notes by Annie Besant. Das alleges that the work is a "summarised translation" of an otherwise unknown "ancient text" by a sage called Gargyayana. Das states that the text was dictated to him from memory by Pandit Dhanaraja Mishra, a theosophist friend of his who was blind in both eyes and had died before the book's publication.

This book has nothing to do with the original Pranava Veda by Mamuni Mayan

== Other works ==
=== English ===
- A Concordance Dictionary to the Yoga-Sutras of Patanjali. Kaashai, Benares 1938.
- A Few Truths about Theosophy, in The Theosophist, Adyar September 1889.
- Ancient Solutions of Modern Problems. Theosophical Publishing House, Adyar 1933.
- Ancient versus Modern "Scientific Socialism", or, Theosophy and Capitalism, Fascism, Communism. Theosophical Publishing House, Adyar 1934.
- Annie Besant and the Changing World. Theosophical Publishing House, Adyar 1934.
- Communalism and Its Cure by Theosophy, or, Spiritual Health, the Only Sure Basis of Material Wealth. Theosophical Publishing House, Adyar 1934.
- Eugenics, Ethics and Metaphysics. Theosophical Publishing House, Adyar 1930.
- Indian Ideals of Women's Education. Current Thought Press, Madras 1929.
- Krishna, A Study in the Theory of Avataras. Theosophical Publishing House, Adyar 1924.
- My Picture of Free India. Indian Book Shop, Benares et al. 1944.
- The Central Hindu College and Mrs. Besant, the Rise of the Alcyone Cult. Divine Life Press, London 1913.
- The Dawn of Another Renaissance. Theosophical Publishing House, Adyar 1931.
- The Essential Unity of All Religions. Theosophical Press, Wheaton 1939.
- The Ethico-Psychological Crux in Political Science and Art, or, Who Should be Legislators?. Theosophical Publishing House, Adyar 1931.
- The Fundamental Idea of Theosophy. Theosophist Office, Madras 1912.
- The Metaphysics and Psychology of Theosophy. in The Theosophist, Adyar 1916. und
- The Philosophy of Non-Co-Operation and of Spiritual-Political Swaraj. Tagore & Co., Madras 1922.
- The Psychology of Conversion. Theosophical Publishing House, Adyar 1917.
- The Religion of Theosophy. Theosophist Office, Madras 1911.
- The Science of Peace, an Attempt at an Exposition of the First Principles of the Science of the Self. Theosophical Publishing House, Benares et al. 1904.
- The Science of Religion, or, Sanatana Vaidika Dharma, an Attempt at an Exposition of Principles. Indian Book Shop, Benares 1948.
- The Science of Social Organisation, or, The Laws of Manu in the Light of Atma Vidya. Theosophical Publishing House, Adyar 1935.
- The Science of Social Organisation, or, The Laws of Manu in the Light of Theosophy. Theosophist Office, Adyar 1910.
- The Science of the Emotions. Theosophical Publishing House, Benares et al. 1908.
- The Spiritualisation of the Science of Politics by Brahma-Vidya. Theosophical Publishing House, Adyar 1919.
- The Superphysics of the Great War. Theosophical Publishing House, Adyar 1916.
- The Historic Trial of Mahatma Gandhi, 1922.

=== Hindi ===
- Darshan Ka Prayojan
- Manupad Anukramani
- Purusharth
- Mahaveer Vani
- Meera ka Kavya
- Rashtra Nirmata Tilak
- Saral Manovigyan
- Mandir Pravesh aur Aspurahyata Nivaran
- Devnagari Lipi Swaroop Vikas aur Samasyaen

== See also ==
- Pranava-Vada

== Literature ==
- Katherine Browning: An epitome of the "science of the emotions", a summary of the work of Pandit Bhagavan Das. Theosophical Publishing House, London 1925.
