= Alattiyur, Malappuram =

Coordinates: 10°52′N 75°56′E

Alathiyur
- Town
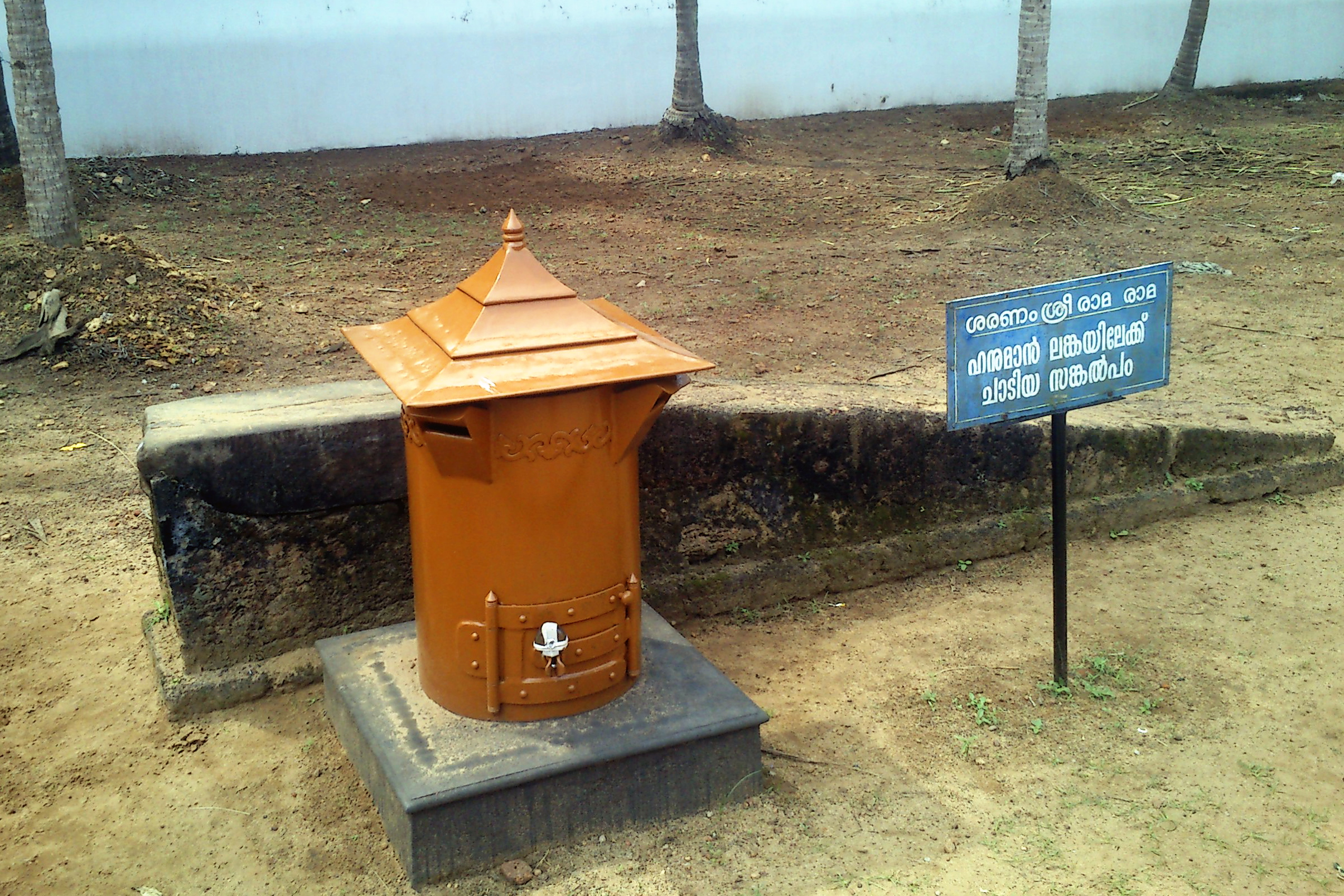
- Nickname: Alathiyur
- Interactive map of Alathiyur
- Country: India
- State: Kerala
- District: Malappuram

Government
  - Body: Triprangode Grama Panchayat

Languages
  - Official: Malayalam, English
- Time zone: UTC+5:30 (IST)
- PIN: 676102
- Telephone code: 0494
- Vehicle registration: KL-55
- Kerala Legislative Assembly: Thavanur
- Lok Sabha constituency: Ponnani

Alathiyur is a village in the Tirur taluk of Malappuram district in Kerala, India. It is part of Triprangode grama panchayat. Alathiyur is located 6 km south of Tirur on the road towards Ponnani. Govinda Bhattathiri, a legendary figure in the Kerala astrological tradition, was born in this village in 1237 CE.

== Culture ==
Alathiyur village is a predominantly Muslim populated area with a Hindu minority. Duff Muttu, Kolkali and Aravanamuttu are common folk arts of this locality. The numerous libraries attached to mosques provide a rich source for Islamic study; most of the books are written in Arabi-Malayalam which is a version of the Malayalam language written in Arabic script. People gather in mosques for the evening prayer and remain there afterwards discussing social and cultural issues. Business and family issues are also sorted out during these evening meetings. The Hindu minority likewise follows their rich traditions, celebrating various festivals in their temples. Hindu rituals are done here with a regular devotion as in other parts of Kerala.

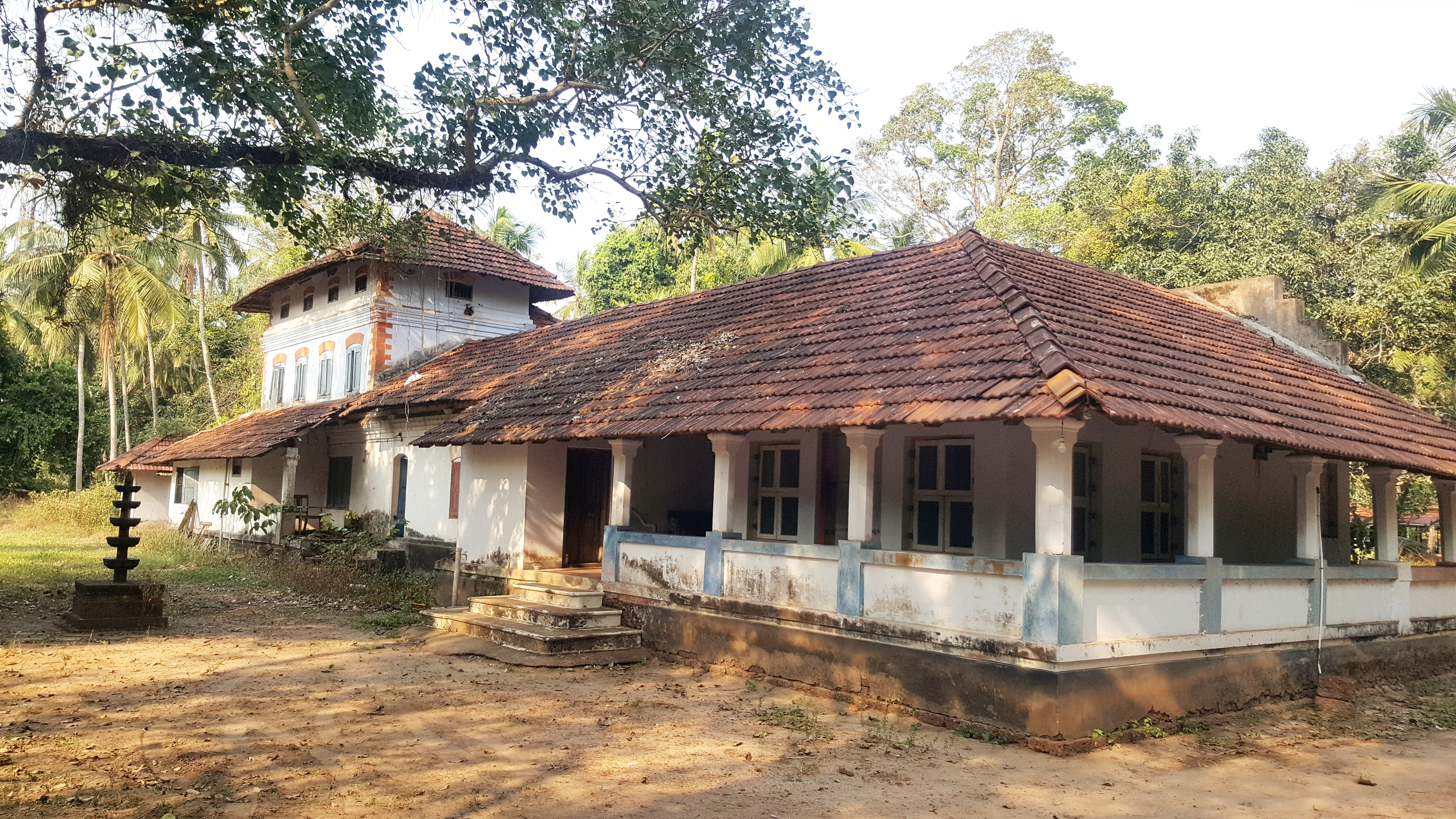
Alattiyur Nambi Illam

== Transportation ==
Alathiyur connects to other parts of India through National Highway 66 via the towns of Kuttipuram, Ponnani and Puthanathani, each located about 14 km (8.7 mi) from Alathiyur. The northern stretch of NH 66 connects to Goa and Mumbai and the southern stretch connects to Cochin and Trivandrum. The nearest airport is at Kozhikode. The nearest major railway station is at Tirur.
