= Yuga Purana =

The Yuga Purana is a Sanskrit text and the last chapter of a Jyotisha (astrology) text Vriddhagargiya Samhita. It is also considered a minor text in the Puranic literature.

== Contents ==
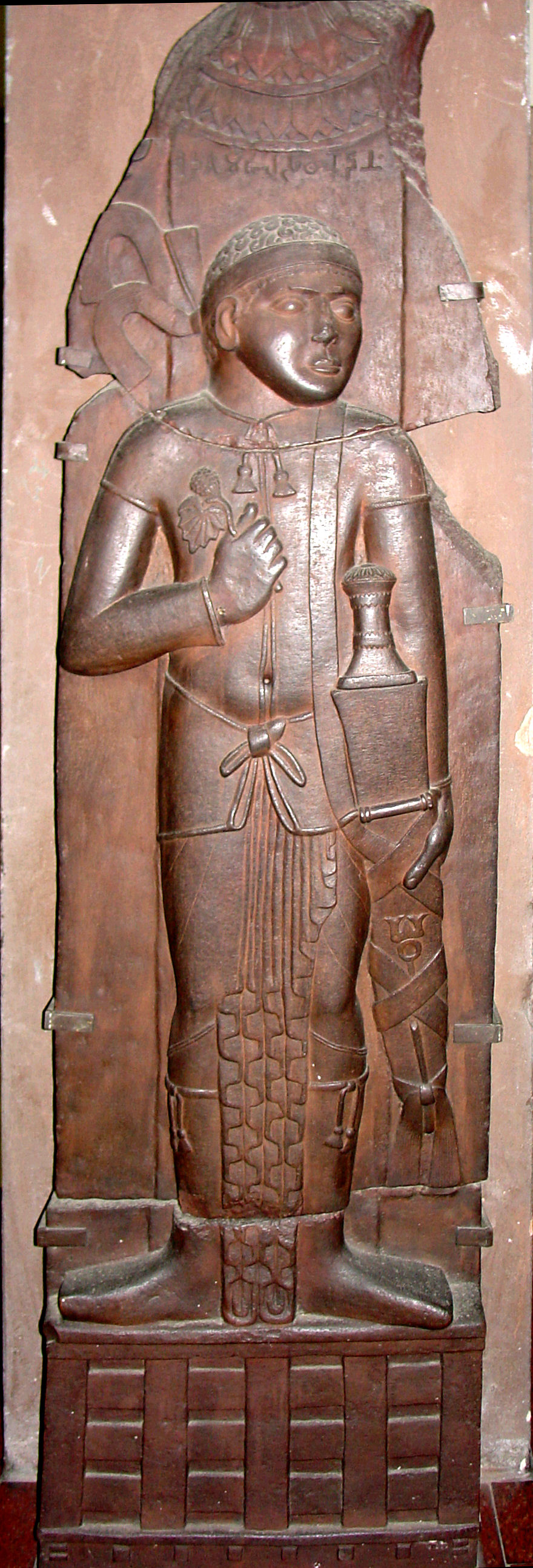
Relief depicting an Indo-Greek warrior, from Bharhut, c.100 BCE

The Yuga Purana is structured as a chronicle, and is notable for historical information presented as a prophecy. It is the only surviving Indian text that includes a detailed description of Greeks who advanced into India after Alexander the Great, and the Indo-Greek conquest of Pataliputra, the capital of the Mauryan Empire. (Note: The Sanskrit grammar treatise Mahābhāṣya by Patañjali (2nd century BCE) and the play Mālavikāgnimitram by Kālidāsa (4th or 5th century CE) contain "brief mentions" of the Indo-Greek incursion and conflict with Pushyamitra Shunga.) It includes mythology, but also chronicles the Magadha empire, Maurya emperor Shalishuka, the Shunga dynasty the Yavanas, and Sakas. The record is described in the style of a "prophecy" (future tense), as if the text was written before recorded human history began.

The invasion of the Yavanas (i.e., Indo-Greeks, under Demetrius I or Menander I, c. 180 BCE) is described in a rather detailed account:

"After having conquered Saketa, the country of the Panchala and the Mathuras, the Yavanas, wicked and valiant, will reach Kusumadhvaja ("The town of the flower-standard", Pataliputra). The thick mud-fortifications at Pataliputra being reached, all the provinces will be in disorder, without doubt. Ultimately, a great battle will follow, with tree-like engines (siege engines)." (Gargi-Samhita Paragraph 5, Yuga Purana.)
"The Yavanas (Greeks) will command, the Kings will disappear. (But ultimately) the Yavanas, intoxicated with fighting, will not stay in Madhyadesa (the Middle Country); there will be undoubtedly a civil war among them, arising in their own country (Bactria), there will be a terrible and ferocious war." (Gargi-Samhita, Yuga Purana chapter, No7).

== Manuscripts and Date ==
The extant manuscripts of the Yuga Purana are in poor form and considered by scholars as highly corrupted over its history, although recent "research has [...] been concerned with establishing a more acceptable text". Its importance is contested, with claims ranging from possibly the "oldest surviving text" with Purana in its title, to "quite late and worthless" manuscript. The few manuscripts discovered are highly inconsistent, and early 20th-century translators reconstructed the manuscript by "liberally altering" proper names in the text to arrive at "guesses at truth" that these manuscripts might have intended. Scholars in the early 20th century (Fleet in 1912, and later William Tarn in 1938) stated that this text is a late text and dismissed the Yuga Purana as historically worthless, with Tarn adding that "naturally, I cannot be sure". However, the situation has been improved by the discovery of eight more manuscripts by Indologist John Mitchiner, who has produced a complete translation of the text.

Sanskrit scholar Ludo Rocher says that "The Yuga [Purana] is important primarily as a historical document. It is a matter-of-fact chronicle [...] of the Magadha empire, down to the breakdown of the Sungas and the arrival of the Sakas. It is unique in its description of the invasion and retirement of the Yavanas in Magadha."

John Mitchiner suggests it to be one of the useful, important and oldest Purana giving it an estimate of c. 25 BCE because of the archaic, unusual Sanskrit found in the text. Mitchiner notes that the manuscripts themselves were likely copied from their sources in 18th or 19th century, but a stemmatic study of the various manuscripts indicates that they are derived from a source "considerably earlier than A.D. 1000." A few scholars place the origin of this astrology-related text to between 1st century BCE to 3rd century CE. Other scholars suggest that this text is written with a mix of Prakrit and Sanskrit languages, but attribute this to "extreme corruption" of the text. There is no consensus on an acceptable version of the text. However, the situation has been improved by the discovery of eight more manuscripts by Indologist John Mitchiner, who has produced a complete translation of the text.
