= Hora Sara =

Hindu astrological text

- Author: Prithuyasas
- Language: Sanskrit
- Subject: Astrology
- Publication place: India

Hora Sara is an ancient treatise on Hindu astrology, in relation to divination, written in the Sanskrit Sloka format. Its author, Prithuyasas, was the son of Varahamihira (505–587 CE).

The text was represented in the 17th century Hora Ratna, where it was stated that "Prithuyasas occupies the zenith in the astrological world through his work, Hora Sara".

Topics covered in its 32 chapters include:

- The characteristics and nature of signs and Planets
- Planetary effects and strengths.
- Negative indications at time of birth
- The effects of Chandra, Raja, Arishta and Nabhasa yogas
