= Brihat Jataka =

Astrological text by Varahamihira

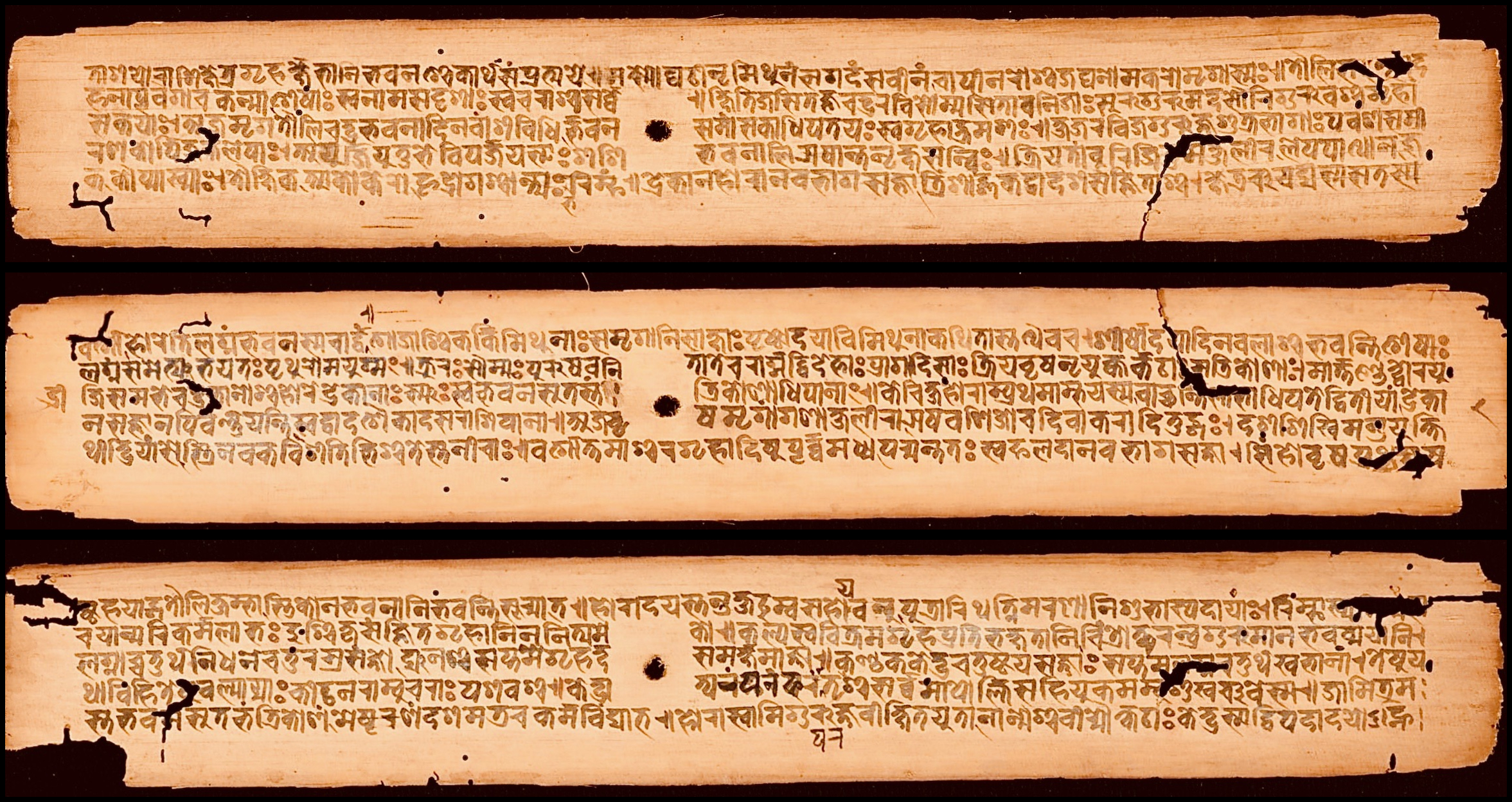
- Brihajjataka manuscript copied in Nepal in 1399 CE in the Nepalaksara script; now at the Cambridge University Library.
- Author: Varāhamihira
- Language: Sanskrit
- Subject: Astrology
- Publication place: India

Brihat Jataka or Brihat Jatakam or Brihajjatakam (Sanskrit: बृहज्जातकम्), is one of the five principal texts written by Varāhamihira, the other four being Panchasiddhantika, Brihat Samhita, Laghu Jataka and Yogayatra. It is also one of the five major treatises on Hindu predictive astrology, the other four being Saravali of Kalyanavarma, Sarvartha Chintamani of Venkatesh, Jataka Parijata of Vaidyanatha and Phaladeepika of Mantreswara. The study of this classic text makes one grasp the fundamentals of astrology.

== Structure ==
Brihat Jataka is considered a standard textbook on Vedic astrology, and sometimes described as "India's foremost astrological text".

The work covers the wide and complex range of predictive astrology. The brevity employed in its composition is noteworthy. In an article titled "On the Authenticity of the (Modern) Brhat Parasara Hora Sastra" published in the July and August 2009 issues of The Astrological Magazine, Bengaluru, the Vedic astrologer Shyamasundaradasa writes that

one was not considered a scholar of jyotish unless he had memorized Brihat Jataka and Prasna Marga not Brhat Parasara Hora Sastra. Brihat Jataka was considered to be a jewel among astrological literature and indeed in my early days of study there were many translations and commentaries on Varahamihira's Brhat Jataka....In South India Brihat Jataka (and its commentaries) is held in the highest esteem, not BPHS. Why? Because of its many ancient commentaries by Bhattotpala and others especially the Dasadhyayi of Talakkulathur Govindam Bhattathiri ...

The classic text Jataka Parijata of Vaidyanatha has word for word borrowed several verses of Brihat Jataka to explain and/or illustrate its view-points etc.

=== Chapters ===
The original text, written in chaste Sanskrit, consists of more than 407 Shlokas or verses that comprise 28 chapters.

- Chapter I : Untitled; begins with a prayer and then proceeds to give explanation of various technical terms and concepts used in respect of planets and zodiacal signs.
- Chapter II : Grahayoni Prabheda or Planetary natures; this chapter explains the characteristics, qualities, natures, positions, significance and relations of planets, their aspects, sources of strength, etc.,.
- Chapter III : Viyoni Janama Adhyaya or Manifold births; deals with births of birds, animals and trees.
- Chapter IV : Nisheka or Consummation of marriage; deals with conception, sex of child, effect of birth-time, birth of twins, triplets etc.;
- Chapter V : Janama Kal Lakshana or Peculiarities of Birth; deals with normal and abnormal births, fate of new-borns, deformities etc.;
- Chapter VI : Balarishta or Planetary combinations indicating early Death; deals with planetary situations indicating early death of new-borns, death of mother or father before birth or soon after birth, time of death, planetary combinations cancelling out early deaths;
- Chapter VII : Ayurdaya or Determination of Longevity; explains methods to determine span of life of humans and also animals, grant of life-years by various planets, etc.;
- Chapter VIII : Dasantradasa or Periods and Sub-periods of planets; this chapter details the directional effects of planets;
- Chapter IX : Ashtaka Varga or Eight-fold inter-relationship of planets and results of their transit in various signs and houses;
- Chapter X : Karamjeeva or Determination of Profession; deals with planetary situations/combinations indicating various professions, inherited wealth, legacies and other means and sources of earning/wealth;
- Chapter XI : Raja yoga or Combinations for Royalty; gives combinations for royalty and political power, downfall, servitude, etc.;
- Chapter XII : Nabhasa Yoga or Special Planetary combinations that have permanent influence and continuous effect on human lives;
- Chapter XIII : Chandra Yogadhyaya or Results from Lunar positions and conjunctions of the Moon with other planets in different signs;
- Chapter XIV : Dwigraha Yogadhyaya or Results from conjunction of two planets in different signs and bhava;
- Chapter XV : Pravrajya Yoga or Sanyasa Yogas indicating Renunciation, results of concentration of many planets in a particular sign or bhava;
- Chapter XVI : Rikshasiladhyaya or Influence of Constellations (Nakshatras) i.e. results of births in various nakshatras;
- Chapter XVII : Rasisiladhyaya or Lunar effects i.e. results of the Moon in various signs;
- Chapter XVIII : Rasisiladhyaya or Results of planets in various signs;
- Chapter XIX : Drishti Phaladhyaya or Results of Planetary aspects, significance, strength of aspects, afflictions caused, etc.;
- Chapter XX : Bhavadhyaya or Results of planets in various Bhavas or houses e.g. the Moon in Aries, Mars in Aries and so on;
- Chapter XXI : Asrya Yogadhyaya or Special planetary combinations, results of planets in own, exaltation or other signs, of aspects on exalted planets, etc.;
- Chapter XXII : Prakirnadhyaya or Mixed results; this chapter details typical situations and extraordinary combinations of planets, role of planets in different parts of sign, etc.;
- Chapter XXIII : Anishtadhyaya or Misfortunes; details prosperity or adversity indicated by planetary situations, combinations and transits, fortunate or unfortunate marriage and issues, ill-health, poverty, slavery, etc.;
- ChapterXXIV : Stree Jatakadhyaya or Female Horoscopy; results of combination of planets applicable to women, nature of woman ascertained via study of trimsamsa, widowhood, etc.;
- Chapter XXV : Niryanadhyaya or Determination of Death, fatal diseases, unnatural death, fate of body after death, the past and future existence of soul, etc.;
- Chapter XXVI : Nasta Jataka or Unknown Horoscopes; details method to construct horoscope based on query-time;
- Chapter XXVII : Drekkanadhyaya or Results of planets in various Decanates;
- Chapter XXVIII : Upasamharadhyaya or Concluding Chapter.

== Commentaries ==
The following information is derived from "On the Authenticity of the (Modern) Brhat Parasara Hora Sastra" by Vedic Astrologer Shyamasundara Dasa:

Kalyanraman refers to twenty commentaries on Brihat Jataka of Varahamihira and Alberuni in his memoirs has mentioned that Balabhadra, who lived before Bhattotpala, had written a commentary on Brihat Jataka. Bhattotpala, who had written his commentary on Brihat Samhita as Utpala, and in his writings refers to Vikramaditya Saka i.e. Vikram Samvat and not Salivahana Saka or Shalivahana era, completed his commentary, Jagaccandrika, on Brihat Jataka in the year 832 A.D. by which year he had also finished commenting upon other works of Varahamihira. His commentary of more than eight thousand verses on Brihat Jataka includes numerous illustrations. There are also three lesser known commentaries on Brihat Jataka considered to be one of the best works on Hindu astrology, they are - Subodhini, Muraksari and Sripatyam. Commentary by Rudra titled - Vivarna though based on Dasadhyayi of Talakkulathur Govinda Bhattathiri is considered to be the superior of these two. Jyotisa, allied to metaphysics, has a philosophical background and aim. A disciplined body, mind and spirit makes one adept in Jyotisa which feature emerges prominently in Brihat Jataka as a basic work on this science and which feature is also brought out with remarkable clearness and force in various commentaries on this text including that of A.N. Srinivasaraghava Aiyangar's Apurvarthapradarsika.
