= Nilakantha Daivajna =

Indian astrologer and author

Nila-kantha (IAST: Nīlakaṇṭha) was a 16th-century astrologer and astronomer (jyotishi or daivajña) and Sanskrit writer from the Mughal Empire of present-day India. He was a royal astrologer to emperor Akbar, and contributed to Todarananda (c. 1572 CE), an encyclopedia sponsored by Akbar's minister Todara-malla. He wrote Tajika-Nilakanthi (1587 CE), the most popular work on the Tajika astrology, and possibly compiled Prashna-tantra, a work on horary astrology, based on an earlier text.

== Biography ==
Nilakantha came from a family of astrologer-astronomers that belonged to the Gargya-gotra (clan), and originated from Dharmapura, a town located on the banks of the Narmada River in central India. The earliest known member of this family is his grandfather, Chintamani. Nilakantha was a son of Ananta and his wife Padmamba. Ananta wrote Kamadhenu-tika (a commentary on Mahadeva's Kamadhenu) and Jani-paddhati (or Jataka-paddhati).

Nilakantha and his brother Rama settled in Kashi, where they composed several works on astrology and astronomy. The town was under the administration of the Mughal emperor Akbar's minister Todara-malla (Todar Mal), and Nilakantha rose to the position of a royal astrologer (jyotisha-raja) in Akbar's administration. Balabhadra, a student of Rama, describes Nilakantha as "the crown jewel in the circle of astrologers", and quotes him extensively in his Hayana-ratna (1649).

Nilakantha's brother Rama wrote Rama-vinoda (1590), Muhurta-chintamani (1600), and a commentary titled Pramitakshara on the 1600 text. Nilakantha's son Govinda (born 1659) wrote Piyusha-dhara (1603), Rasala (1622), and Bhava-vivrti. Govinda's son Chintamani wrote Sammati-chintamani (1661).

== Works ==
=== Todarananda sections ===
In the 16th century, the Mughal Emperor Akbar's minister Todaramallla sponsored the compilation of Todarananda (Ṭoḍarānanda, or Todaranandam), the most extensive encyclopedia of science from pre-modern India. Nilakantha contributed to multiple sections (saukhyas) of this work, including Jyautisha-saukhya (on jyotisha); two sections on muhurta - Vivaha-saukhya and Vastu-saukhya; and other sections on various dharma-shastra branches - Vyavahara-saukhya, Samskara-saukhya, and Samaya-saukhya.

The Jyautisha-saukhya, completed in 1572, discusses omens (samhita); astronomy, possibly including mathematics (ganita); and natal astrology (hora).

=== Tajika-Nilakanthi ===
Nilakantha's Tajika-Nilakanthi (IAST: Tājikanīlakaṇṭhī) is a work on Tajika, the Sanskritized Perso-Arabic astrology tradition. The work contains two volumes:

- Samjna-tantra (Saṃjñā-tantra), introduction to the fundamental principles and terminology of Tajika
- Varsha-tantra (Varṣa-tantra), a compendium of techniques for annual prognostication

These two volumes appear to have been composed as semi-independent works, and contain overlapping content, including passages repeated verbatim. Nilakantha completed the second volume of this work in 1587, and the book became the most popular work on the Tajika astrology.

An analysis by Ola Wikander and Martin Gansten suggests that the Shodasha-yogadhyaya (Ṣoḍaśayogādhyāya) chapter of Samjna-tantra is based on far older sources, and this may be true of the entire book. However, the phrasing appears to be Nilakantha's original. It is possible that Samjna-tantra and Varsha-tantra were the titles of two earlier texts written by the 13th century writer Samara-simha, and along with Prashna-tantra, were collectively known as Tājika-shastra (Tājikaśāstra).

In the 17th century, Vishva-natha Daivajna wrote a commentary titled Prakashika (Prakāśikā) on Prashna-tantra.

=== Prashna-tantra ===
Nilakantha may or may not have been responsible for the compilation of Prashna-tantra (IAST: Praśna-tantra), a work on horary astrology. This work exists in two versions: some earlier sources have mistakenly attributed its authorship to Nilakantha, considering it as the third volume of Tajika-nilakanthi. Alternative titles for the book include Prashna-kaumudi (Praśnakaumudī), Jyotisha-kaumudi (Jyotiṣakaumudī), or Prashna-prakarana.

Research by Martin Gansten (2014) shows that the original Prashna-tantra was written by Samara-simha in the 13th century, largely based on Sahl ibn Bishr's 9th century text Kitāb fi l-masa'il wa-l-ahkam. Nilakantha or one of his students may have compiled the hybrid version of Prashna-tantra to complement the two volumes of Tajika-Nilakanthi, by including excerpts from other texts to the original work. These other texts include mainly non-Tajika Sanskrit works such as Bhattotpala's Prashna-jnana, Padma-prabha-suri's Bhuvana-dipaka, Narayana-dasa Siddha's Prashna-vaishnava, Prthyu-yashas's Shatpanchashika, Varaha-mihira's Brhadyatra, Ramachandra's Samara-sara, Yaska's Nirukta, Prashna-chintamani, Prashna-dipaka, Prashna-pradipa, Trailokya-prakasha, and Jnana-muktavali, among others.

In the 17th century, Vishva-natha Daivajna wrote a commentary on Prashna-tantra.
