= Garga Hora =

Astrological text by Rishi Garga

Garga Horā
- Author: Ṛṣi Garga
- Language: Sanskrit
- Subject: Astrology
- Publication place: India

Garga Horā is a very ancient treatise on the predictive part of Hindu astrology. Its author, Ṛṣi Garga, is one of the sages of the Purāṇika times. He was the son of Ṛṣi Bharadvāja. There are 8 Siddhāntas of Hindu astrology, they are – Brahmā, Sūrya, Soma, Vasiṣṭhta, Pulastya, Romaka, Arya, and Garga Siddhāntas – the last named is named after the author of Garga Horā, and Garga Saṁhitā, and with whom Jyotiṣa is associated. Garga Horā is written in the Sanskrit Sutra – format and from this work Varāhamihira has drawn profusely. Incidentally, both, Garga and Varāhamihira, have in their respective works referred to the proficiencies of the Greeks in the field of Astronomy.

Parāśara is considered to be most ancient of Hindu astronomers, and second in order of time is Garga, whom Gauranga Nath Bannerjee, while agreeing with Dr.Kern, places in the 1st Century B.C. Bala Bhadra, the author of Horā Ratnaṁ, and whose method is considered to be more authoritative in South India was greatly influenced by Garga.
