= Paravoor Sreedharan Thanthrikal =

Indian teacher and priest (1925-2011)

- പരവൂർ ശ്രീധരൻ തന്ത്രികൾ
- Born: Paravoor Sreedharan
- Died: 17 May 2012; Kochi, Kerala, India
- Citizenship: India
- Education: Traditional Gurukula education
- Occupations: Tantri, Priest,

Paravoor Sreedharan Thanthrikal was an Indian tantri, priest, astrologer and scholar of Vedic and tantric traditions from Kerala. He served as thantri of more than 200 temples and was the first non-Brahmin thantri in the tradition of Sree Narayana Guru.

== Life ==
He was a Tantri and priest in Sreekanteswara (Shiva) temple, Kozhikode which was established by the Hindu philosopher and teacher Sree Narayana Guru. He learnt under the Tantri maestro Kandassan asan (Sreekandan vaidyar) of Ayyampilly, a disciple of Kochunni thampuran of kodungallur. Asan made him join Pazhoor padippura to learn practical applications of astrology. He was also a lyricist of Malayalam devotional songs and an astronomer.

He participated in the Ashtamangala Devaprasnam at Sabarimala, Guruvayur, Vaikom, Chottanikkara, Kadambuzha and Kodungalloor temples. He was the recipient of several awards, including the Amrutha Keerthi Puraskar, Pavakulangara Award and the Swamy Mrudanandaji Memorial Adhyatma Puraskar. He wrote a book which tells about Sraaddhakriya with title "Pritru Karmavidhi".

== Death ==
Paravoor Sreedharan Thanthrikal died on 17 May 2012 at a private hospital in Kochi at the age of 86 after being hospitalized due to illness. His cremation was held at his residence in Paravoor, Kerala.

== Recognition ==
He was honoured by Jayendra Saraswathi of the Kanchi Kamakoti Peetham following a Vidwat Sadas held at the Guruvayur Parthasarathi Temple.
