= The Psychology of Conversion =

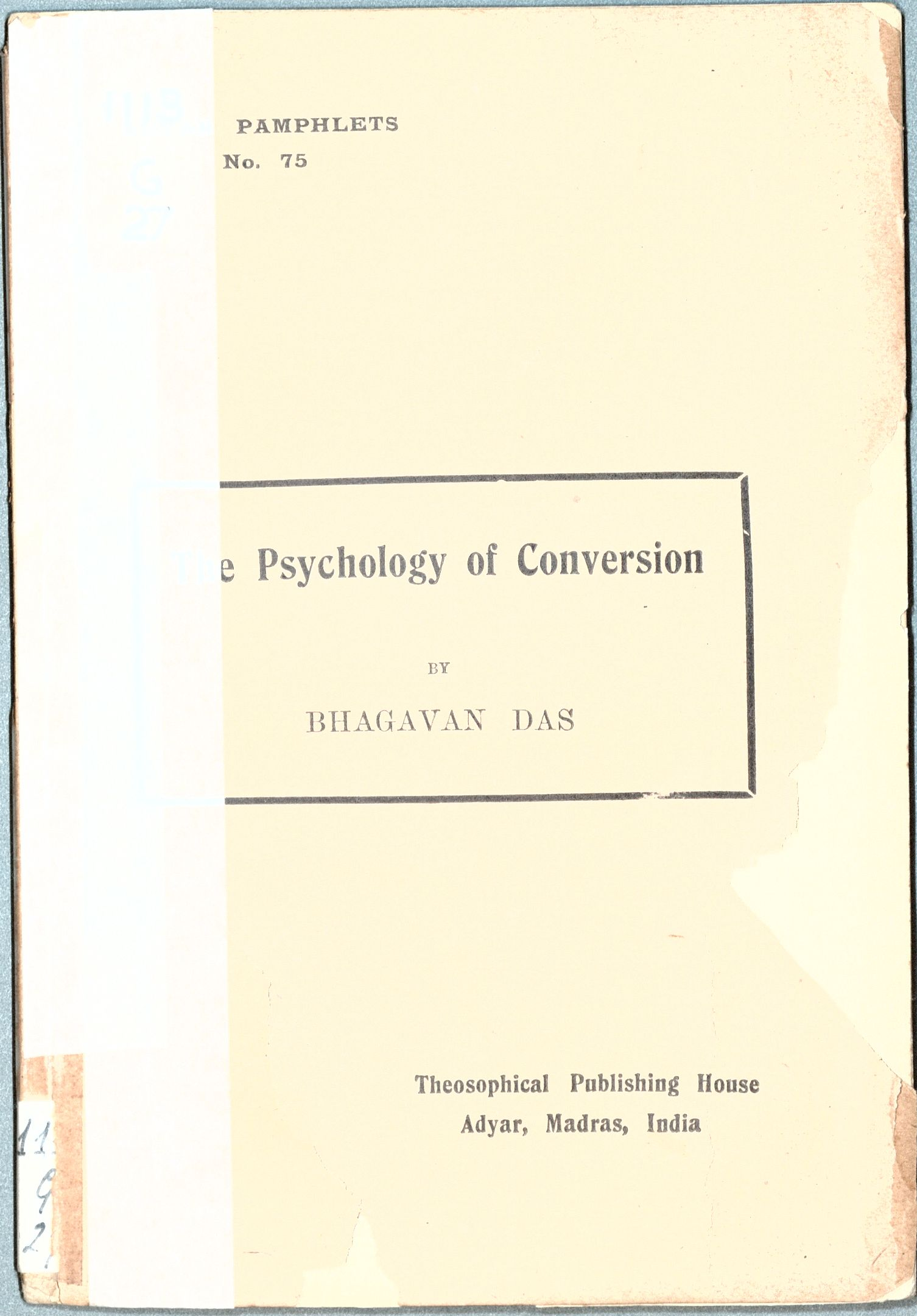
- Book cover
- Author: Bhagavan Das
- Genre: Psychology of religion
- Publication date: 1917

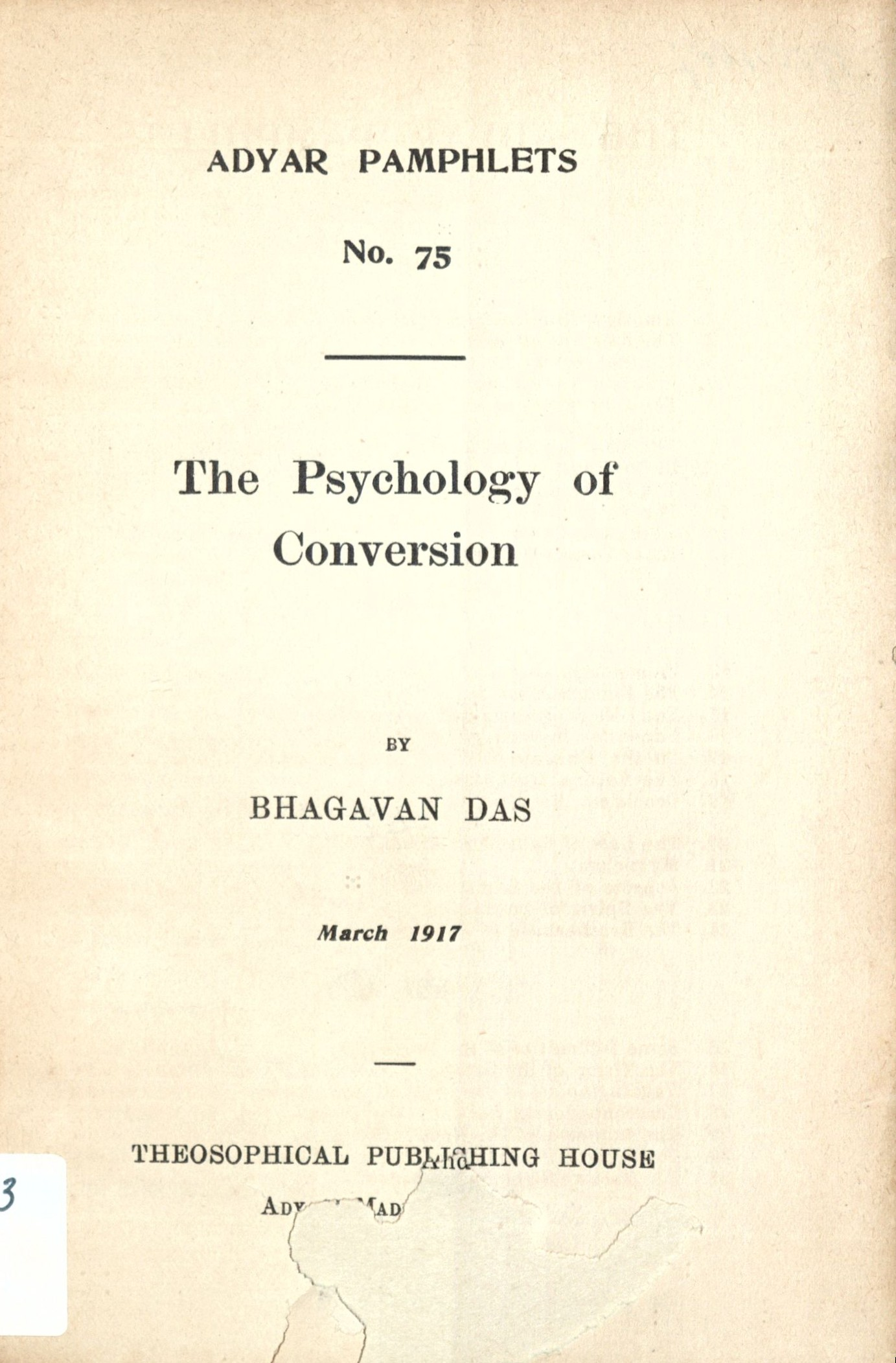
Title page

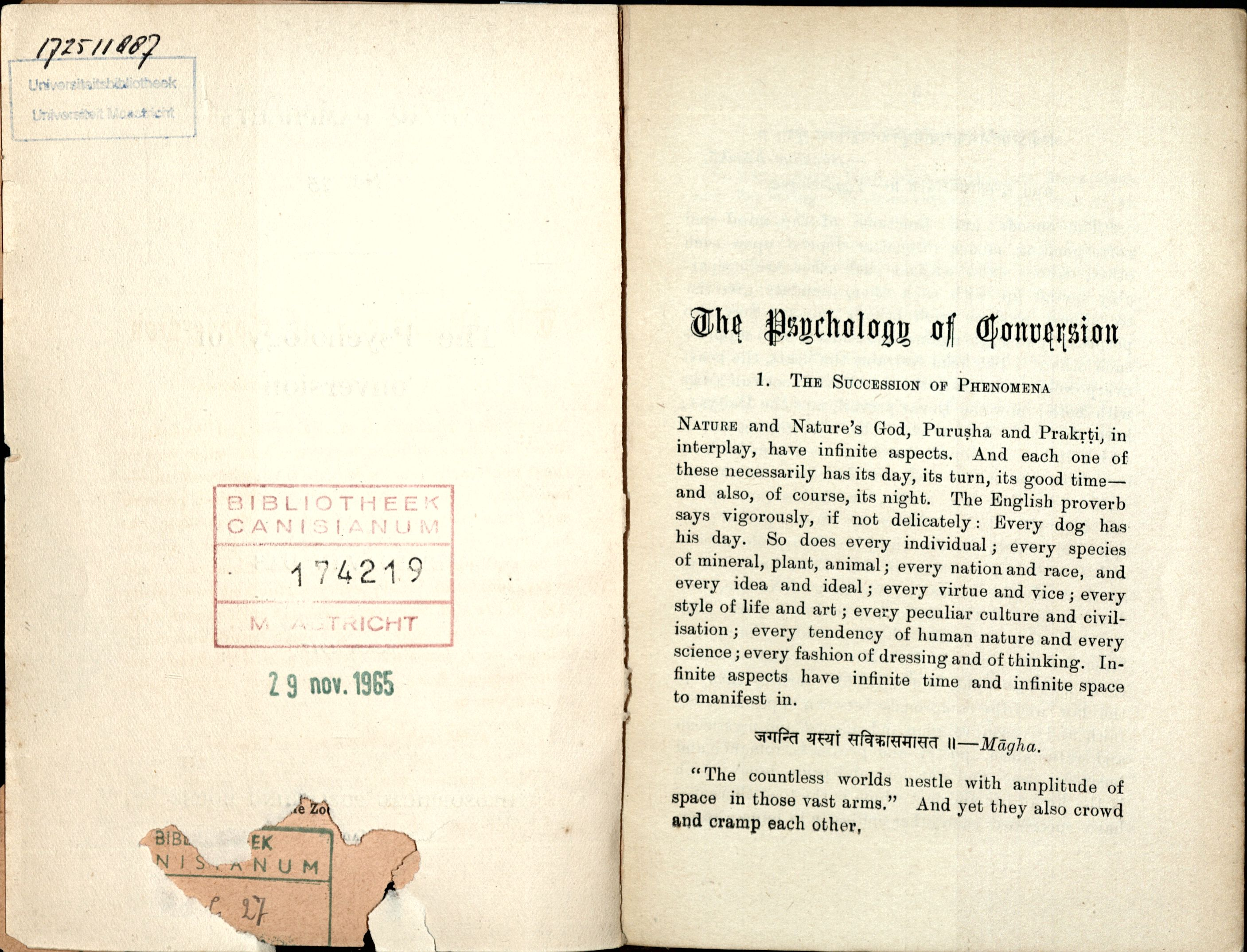

The Psychology of Conversion is a pamphlet written by the Indian theosophist Dr. Bhagavan Das and published by the Theosophical Publishing House in Adyar, India, in March 1917. It is part of the Adyar Pamphlets, a series of short works by the Theosophical Society. The book covers religious conversion from the perspectives of Hinduism, Theosophical philosophy and early 20th-century Western psychology of religion, particularly William Jame's Varieties of Religious Experience and psychologists such as Edwin D. Starbuck, James H. Leuba and James B. Pratt.

== Context ==
Bhagavan Das published The Psychology of Conversion in 1917 during a period where the three disciplines of Hindu religious thought, Theosophy and Western psychology of religion were developing distinct understandings on religious conversion.

Traditional Hindu teachings discussed three paths of religious change: Karma (path of action), Bhakti (path of devotion) and Jnana (path of knowledge). Hindu philosophy additionally characterized development as a gradual process, which it describes in four stages of life: student (Brahmacharya), family-man (Gārhasthya), publicist (Vānaprastha), and ascetic (Sannyāsa). The early stages were characterized by doubts and struggles, which needed to be resolved to reach internal peace. Spiritual transformation or religious change according to traditional Hindu thought was a personal and not well defined journey, individuals could choose which of the three paths of change to follow. There are thirty-three gods (Tridasha) that are considered primary deities referenced in Ancient Hindu scriptures. The principle of Ishtadevata (personal deity) within Hinduism taught that individuals may focus their devotion towards one deity that is deemed the best guidance for their own spiritual journal.

The rule of India by the British Crown lasted from 1858 to 1947. During pre-colonial times, shifts in religious devotion were considered gradual, communal processes with relatively fluid boundaries on what conversion is. During colonial rule, colonial law required fixed religious identities to be declared on colonial census operations. In the late 19th century and early 20th century, many Christian Missionaries and colonial authorities framed Hinduism as a primitive religion that they needed to save individuals from. In response, various Hindu reform movements emerged, these movements, particularly the Arya Samaj, developed campaigns to "reconvert" individuals away from Christianity. While others, such as Swami Vivekananda instead attempted to spread a positive view of Hinduism among the West through lectures and interfaith dialogue. Vivekananda's speech to the 1894 World's Parliament of Religions is considered as a monumental moment in familiarizing the West with Hinduism. Vivekananda was later credited with playing a significant role in raising the characterization of Hinduism to a world religion. Vivekananda worked to present a reformed version of Hinduism, known as neo-Vedanta or modern Hinduism, that focused on spirituality and philosophy, embraced certain aspects of science and rejected practices like idol worship. This emphasis on spiritual and philosophical components of Hinduism was found in Bhagavan Das's 1917 book The Psychology of Conversion.

At the same time as the Hindu reform movements emerged, and Hindu teachings were being reformed, the foundational years of Western psychological research on religious conversion were occurring, which scholars claim stretched from 1896 to 1930s. James H. Leuba's article "A Study in the Psychology of Religious Phenomenon," published in 1896, was the first academic article to define conversion as a psychological process. In the following year, Edwin D. Starbuck's article "A Study of Conversion," was the first known attempt to gather empirical data on religious conversion, which Starbuck did through by using questionnaires. Both Leuba and Starbuck studied under G. Stanley Hall at Clark University, within the Clark School of Religious Psychology. The Clark School of Psychology focused on studying religion through empirical methodologies, specifically questionnaires and statistical analyses, and conducted their research on North American Protestant Christian populations. In 1902, William James published his book The Varieties of Religious Experience based on his investigations on religious conversion through gathering first-person accounts on religious experiences and then using an interpretive analysis approach to understand the inner experiences of conversion. James mainly took first-person accounts from American Protestant Christians. Western researchers during this time mainly defined conversion as an individual and well defined singular shift from sinning to being virtuous. While attempts to spread Hindu thought to the west were made during this period, it was largely ignored by leading Western psychologists studying religious conversion, who only focused on Protestant Christian participants.

Bhagavan Das, was considered a distinguished student, earning a B.A. at sixteen and a M.A. in philosophy at eighteen. Afterwards he worked in government service as Deputy Collector and magistrate in Uttar Pradesh from 1890 to 1899. While he was no longer in university, it is said that learning, especially learning about religions and philosophy, was one of his largest interests. In 1894, after hearing a speech by Annie Besant, he was inspired to join the Theosophy Society. He came under the influence of Besant and had extensive engagement with spiritualism and philosophical debates during his time in the Theosophical Society. Through the Theosophical Publishing house, Das published approximately 30 books and many articles in Sanskrit, Hindi and English, such as Science of Social Organization, Science of Peace, the Psychology of Conversion and many other contributions. A majority of his works were about philosophy, ancient India lore, psychology and socialism. After joining the Society, one of his major beliefs was said to be synthesis, he believed strongly that bridging Western and Eastern thought would bring more peace to the world. By the mid-1910s, Das was actively attempting to spread his ideals of joining Eastern and Western thought, universal brotherhood and a universal religion. Portions of what would become The Science of Religion, or Sanatana Vaidika Dharma first appeared in the Central Hindu College Magazine in 1914 and 1915. In this book, which was published in March 1917, Das laid out various root-principles and ideas of Sanatana Vaidika Dharma, the Universal Religion, which according to Das is the foundation for a universal society, universal brotherhood and a universal science. Das in this book described how through unity, life would be more peaceful and richer both spiritually and materially. Part of this push to spread his ideas of synthesis between religions was his 1917 pamphlet the Psychology of Religion. Das's pamphlet was distinctive in his time for academically exploring conversion in religions outside of Christianity, namely Hinduism, and for attempting to synthesize Western psychological approaches with Hindu perspectives on conversion.

The Theosophical Society and its philosophy were largely shaped by the spiritual teachings of its founder, Helena Blavatsky. Her works such as Isis Unveiled (1877) and the Secret Doctrine (1888) were considered key literature within the society. These texts were considered esoteric and difficult to understand. To address this, the Society created the Adyar Pamphlets, a series of short works published between 1911 and 1936 with the aim of making Blavatsky's ideas more accessible. Many of the pamphlets were essays, extracts from larger works or reprints of lectures designed to be used in study courses or as introductory reading for new members.

== Contents ==
The Psychology of Conversion by Bhagavan Das is a short philosophical pamphlet with 12 chapters that examines the universal law of rotation and the process of conversion within a Hindu framework. The main purpose of the pamphlet is to explain Hindu teachings and Blavatsky's teachings on religious conversion in a simplified manner to easily educate others. With other goals being to spread the ideas of universal brotherhood, a universal religion and a universal science

Das begins the pamphlet with a statement on what he calls the universal law of rotation: all phenomena "necessarily has its day, its turn, its good time — and also, of course, its night." Everything will experience a rise and fall for eternity. This is the main theme of the pamphlet which is brought up throughout the entire work. Das writes about this universal law of rotation with the purpose of explaining to the audience how changes and turns in one's life, such as religious conversion, is the natural order of the world. According to Das, right now one might be experiencing doubts and internal conflict, but inevitably the reader will accept the guidance of higher powers and spiritual teachers and reach inner peace. Das claims the universal law of rotation is a result of an interplay between Prakriti (Nature) and Purusha (Nature's God). In this pamphlet, Prakriti is characterized as the constantly changing material reality. While Purusha is the motionless "spectator-consciousness", which by merely witnessing provides direction ("motive force") to that constant motion. According to Das, this interplay generates the "drama", the cyclical law of rise and fall, of the universe.

Das in chapters 2 and 3 attempts to explain how religious conversion and the law of rotation are universal concepts, found in all religions. To support his argument Das described examples from Christianity, Judaism and Hinduism. Das points out similarities between western views of conversion by William James, Edwin Starbuck and James Leuba with views within Hindu Culture with both arguing that conversion is an experience where one goes from egoism and sin to altruism, virtue and faith. Das takes his theme of universality further by explaining how all religions as aspects of one religion, as all religions are attempting to reach the one universal truth. This framework reflects the broader goal of universal brotherhood and religion of Das and the Theosophical society.

From chapters 3 to 11, Das explains in more detail religious conversion, the different forms of conversion every individual will experience and the stages of conversion. In this section Das begins by outlining the triple way of Dharma which consists of the Jñana-kãnda (knowledge), the Bhakti-kãnda (emotion) and the Karma-kãnda (action). Das argues that conversion is a reorientation of the entire person, your beliefs, your feelings and what you practice. With each form of conversion corresponding to Jnana, Bhakti and Karma. Das discusses how conversion can be a gradual process, outlining the four stages (āśramas) of life in Hindu teaching: student (Brahmacharya), family-man (Gārhasthya), publicist (Vānaprastha), and ascetic (Sannyāsa). Das claims the first two stages correspond to sin and internal doubts and the later two virtue and peace. In the final conversion, the doubts and internal struggles of the earlier stages are resolved and stabilized. The soul completes its conversion and one's Jñana-kãnda (knowledge), the Bhakti-kãnda (emotion) and the Karma-kãnda (action) are in harmony. Das ends the pamphlet by restating the universal law of rotation:

“Nothing in the world is single

All things, by a law divine,

In one another's being mingle.”

== Reception ==
Since its publication in 1917, the Psychology of Conversion has primarily had impact within the Theosophy Society and religious psychology, serving as an educational tool for other Theosophists, along with the other Adyar Pamphlets. The pamphlet is available through Theosophical collections and digital archives. The pamphlet was referenced in a 2018 article in the Indian Journal of Psychiatry which discussed cultural manifestations of psychopathology, including reported sightings of succubus and yakshini figures, where Das's pamphlet was cited as a historical reference for understanding spiritual and psychological aspects of religion.

During the foundational years of religious psychology, from 1896 to 1930s, leading researchers in the field, William James and Edwin Starbuck, along with other contemporaries, described conversion as a sudden and decisive internal shift, a shift from a "divided self" facing internal crisis to a unified and renewed self that experiences personal peace. Das's pamphlet mirrors this early model that dominated the first wave in the field of the psychology of conversion. In the 1920s to 1930s, Sigmund Freud and Carl Jung introduced and popularized the depth psychological approach to understanding religious conversion. Freud and Jung believed unconscious and irrational needs motivated individuals to religiously convert and accept God because God is forgiving and promises eternal life. To Freud and Jung those unconscious motivations can be fully understood through the methods of dream analysis and interpreting meanings behind patient's free associations. From the 1930s to 1960s, research on religious psychology was almost nonexistent, several reasons for this decline has been proposed. Firstly, the relative secularism of psychologists would have made them uninterested in researching the topic. Secondly, backlash towards psychology research from Roman Catholic Leaders discouraged research. Thirdly, psychology during the mid-20th century attempted to establish itself as a science and thus distanced itself from religion. In the 1950s and 1960s, many North American and Western European youths began joining New Religious Movements (NRM) during a counterculture era. This renewed interest in studying religious conversion, and led to research on conversion outside of Christian contexts. Following the 1960s, psychology of religion continued to expand its scope and developed more empirical and interdisciplinary approaches to studying conversion.

After publishing The Psychology of Conversion, Bhagavan Das remained active in the Theosophical Society, publishing various other works through its publishing house, but in a more diminished role. In 1913, he wrote The Central College and Mrs Besant, a pamphlet criticizing Annie Besant's claims of the then child Jiddu Krishnamurti as the "New Messiah". Das claimed in that pamphlet such false statements were damaging to the reputation Theosophy. Referring to the events with Besant and Krishnamurti, Das in a 1934 statement, recalled that since the “deplorable controversies of 1912–13” he had been no more than a “distant well-wisher” of the Society. In the following decades, Das focused on broader philosophical and political topics. Some notable works are The Science of Social Organization and The Science of Peace. Albert E.S. Smythe, General Secretary of the Canadian branch of the Theosophical Society, in 1941 during World War II, referred to these works as valuable guidance on peace and social order that was being overlooked by the Theosophical Society. Commenting "In years to come it will be one of the reproaches of Adyar that it has not done more honour to Bhagavan Das."
