= Pharwala, Jalandhar =

Pharwala
- Village
- Location in Punjab, India Pharwala (India)
- Coordinates: 31°05′18″N 75°39′59″E
- Country: India
- State: Punjab
- District: Jalandhar
- Tehsil: Phillaur

Government
  - Type: Panchayat raj
  - Body: Gram panchayat

Area
  - Total: 381 ha (940 acres)

Population (2011)
  - Total: 1,709; 883/826 ♂/♀
  - Scheduled Castes: 810; 436/374 ♂/♀
  - Total Households: 360

Languages
  - Official: Punjabi
- Time zone: UTC+5:30 (IST)
- Telephone: 01826
- ISO 3166 code: IN-PB
- Vehicle registration: PB-37
- Website: jalandhar.gov.in

Pharwala is a village in Phillaur in Jalandhar district of Punjab State, India. It is located 12 kilometres (7.5 mi) from sub district headquarter and 35 kilometres (22 mi) from district headquarter. The village is administrated by Sarpanch an elected representative of the village.

== Demography ==
As of 2011, the village has a total number of 360 houses and a population of 1709 of which 883 are males while 826 are females. According to the report published by Census India in 2011, out of the total population of the village 810 people are from Schedule Caste and the village does not have any Schedule Tribe population so far.

== Notable people ==
- Pandit Roop Chand Joshi (1898-1982) the author Lal Kitab

== See also ==
- List of villages in India
