= Ocriers Gargas XIII =

French rugby league club

Club information
- Full name: Les Ocriers de Gargas XIII
- Nickname(s): Les Ocriers
- Founded: 2007; 18 years ago

Current details
- Ground(s): Stade Municipal de Gargas
- Chairman: Olivier Poletto
- Competition: National Division 2 (Provence-Alpes-Cote d'Azur Region)

Uniforms
Home colours

Ocriers Gargas XIII are a French Rugby league club based in Gargas, in the region of Vaucluse. The club plays in the Provence-Alpes-Cote d'Azur regional National Division 2 league, which is the 4th tier competition in France. Founded in 2007 home games are played at the Stade Municipal de Gargas.

== History ==
The senior side was founded in 2007 but prior to that there was a successful junior set-up in Gargas. The juniors compete in tournaments and have won many titles at all under age levels. The senior side have always competed in the bottom level National Division 2 league. 2015/16 represented their most successful season yet as they finished top of the regional Provence-Alpes-Cote d'Azur league before losing out in the play-offs.
