= Prasna Marga =

Hindu astrological text

Prasna Shastra
- Author: Narayanan Nambutiri of Panakkattu house in Edakkattu village
- Translator: Bangalore Venkata Raman
- Language: Sanskrit
- Subject: Astrology
- Publication place: India

Prasna Marga is a work on Hindu astrology, natal and horary ('Prashna' means 'Horary'), that appears to be a major classical text covering every aspect of human existence. It was written in Sanskrit Sloka – format in the year 1649 at Edakad near Tellasseri in the present Indian State of Kerala, by Narayanan Nambutiri of Panakkattu house (a Namboodari Brahmin). The author himself wrote a brief commentary to his book with the name 'Durgamartha prakasini'. This work is known in English through the commentary written by Punnasseri Nambi Neelakantha Sarma, a disciple of Kerala Varma.

== Contents ==
All Parashari principles are briefly available in this classic, and about which principles it is claimed that one conversant with the six branches of Jyotisa will never err in predictions.

Prasna Marga is the most comprehensive and elaborate exposition of Horary astrology. This classic occupies a high position of pride within the tradition of Indian astrology. In Prasna Marga each house is allotted a fixed number of Sarvashtaka bindus above which the house prospers (this concept is taken from Ashtakavarga chapter of BPHS or Brihat Parashara Hora Shastra, the foundational classic of Indian predictive astrology)). Prasna Marga also uses many techniques, like Navams-Navams, Navams-Dvadasams, etc. which are not used by anyone in current practice, but they were used in earlier eras.

== See also ==
- Ashtamangala prasnam
