= Lal Kitab =

Hindu astrological text in Urdu 95%

Lal Kitab (Hindi: लाल किताब, Urdu: لال کتاب, literally Red Book) is a set of five books on Vedic astrology and palmistry, written in Hindi and later, in the Urdu script too.

Poetic verses form the core farmanns or upaya (remedy recommended) of the book. It has led to field of remedial astrology known as Lal Kitab remedies, simple remedies for various planetary afflictions in the horoscope or birth chart, which have become part of the folk traditions of the region that includes North India and Pakistan.

== Authorship & the practitioners of today ==
Although, the author of the original verses is unknown or a matter of debate, however, Pandit Roop Chand Joshi (1898-1982) of Pharwala village of Jalandhar district of Punjab, who authored the presently available version during the years 1939 to 1952 in five volumes, is regarded as the master of this science. Some regard him also as originator of these books. The names of the five set of books authored by Pt. Roop Chand Joshi, together called as Lal Kitab with their years of publication, are as follows.

1. Lal Kitab Ke Farman (The Edicts of Lal Kitab), 1939, 383 pages
2. Lal Kitab Ke Arman (Ilm Samudrik Kee Lal Kitab Ke Armaan), (The “Aspirations” of Lal Kitab), 1940, 280 pages
3. Gutka (Ilm Samudrik Kee Lal Kitab) (Third Part), 1941, 428 pages
4. Lal Kitab Ke Farman (Lal Kitab – Tarmeem Shuda), 1942, 384 pages
5. Ilm-e Samudrik ki buniyad par ki Lalkitab (Lal Kitab), 1952, 1173 pages

A copy of first book published in 1939 is preserved in Lahore Museum.

== Contents ==
Lal Kitab explains how certain planetary positions in one's horoscope should also reflect in the lines of his palm. In other word the book is on astro-palmistry, that is, it has mixed the two different arts of Palmistry and Jyotisha a.k.a. Hindu astrology together.

The books were published in red hard-cover. In Hindi and Urdu languages Lal means the color red and Kitab means a book. Further, in India traditionally, business ledger books are bound in red color. Red in Hindu is considered auspicious and a symbol of Ganesha and Lakshmi. The red kum-kum is used in Hindu religious rites. The Lal Kitab volumes were also given a red binding because these books contain duniyavi hisaab kitaab (the ledger book of one’s life).

Lal Kitab describes a style of horoscope analysis with remedies that omit pooja and wearing of gemstones, which are generally recommended by other branches of Vedic astrology and Jyotisha. There are many followers of Lal Kitab. In India and abroad one can find many practitioners of Lal Kitab, prescribing remedies as per farmanns of these books.

== Cultural influences ==
The book has been popular in both India and Pakistan, and many of its astrological remedies upaya or farmans have become part of everyday culture in the subcontinent, like throwing coins into a river while passing over it, feeding grass to a cow, bread to a dog and offering meals to unmarried girls etc. Some of its farmans have become proverbs, in languages such as Multani.

== Bibliography ==
- Lal Kitab: System Of Progression And Curative Measure, by R. S. Chillar. Sagar Publications, 2004. ISBN 81-7082-050-2.
- Rup Chand Joshi (1941). Lal Kitab, Volume 3 – via Internet Archive.
- U. C. Mahajan (2004). Lal Kitab - a Rare Book on Astrology. Pustak Mahal. ISBN 81-223-0884-8.
- Radhakrishan Srimali (2007). Lal Kitab. Diamond Pocket Books Ltd. ISBN 978-81-288-1256-9.
