= Garga (skipper) =

Scientific classification
- Kingdom: Animalia
- Phylum: Arthropoda
- Class: Insecta
- Order: Lepidoptera
- Family: Hesperiidae
- Genus: Garga

Genus of butterflies

Garga is a genus of skippers (butterfly) in the family Hesperiidae.
