= Gargya =

Gārgya (feminine Gārgī, "descendant of Garga") may refer to:

- Author of some of the sukthas of Atharva Veda, son of Garga and father of Kalayavana
- King of Gandharvas
- Author of the Samaveda-Padapatha

== See also ==
- Garga (disambiguation)
