= Ashtamangala prasnam =

Hindu astrological practice

Ashtamangala prasnam is a certain type of practice of the prasna branch of Hindu astrology. The terminology indicates the use of eight (ashta) auspicious (mangala) objects in its practice. These objects are ghee lamps (brass lamps with a wick in clarified butter), mirror, gold, milk, yogurt, fruits, book, and white cloth. The practice of ashtamangala prasnam is highly popular and held in high esteem in the Indian state of Kerala and Tulu Nadu. In fact, the author of Prasna Marga, an authoritative book on its practice was written by Narayanan Nambutiri, an astrologer from Edakad, Thalasseri in Kerala. Prasna Marga was written in 1649 CE.

Prasna is one of the six important branches of Hindu astrology. It deals with horary astrology in which an astrologer attempts to answer a question by constructing a horoscope for the exact time at which the question was received and understood by the astrologer. The other branches are jataka (natal astrology) which attempts to determine an individual's personality and path in life based on the horoscope of the individual, muhurta (electional astrology) in which the practitioner decides the most appropriate time for an event based on the astrological auspiciousness of that time, nimitta (interpretation of omens), gola (study of astronomy) and ganita (study of mathematics).

== Outline of the Ashtamangala Prasna rituals ==
The process begins by extending a formal invitation to an astrologer to perform an Ashtamangala Prasna. The astrologer then fixes a date for the Prasna based on the principles of electional astrology. The services of two astrologers are required for conducting the Prasna. On the day fixed for the Prasna, a priest would perform a puja of the zodiac. During that time the main astrologer would ask a girl or boy to keep the gold coin randomly in one of the twelve houses drawn on a wooden plank placed before the astrologer. Based on the house in which the coin was placed and on certain numbers computed during the process, the question-answer session begins. The full session may extend up to two days. After full diagnosis, remedial measures are finalized on the last day of Prasna. A person for performing the remedial measures is also finalized. The main astrologer prepares a report mentioning all the relevant facts and details of remedial measures. Remedial measures are arranged according to the availability of the designated person and suitability of the persons conducting the Prasna.

== Ashtamangala number ==
Ashtamangala prasna uses not only omens but a lot of numerology also. One important component of the initial stages of the prasna process is the determination of the Ashtamangala number. The instrument for deriving these are cowry shells which have been specially selected, cleaned, sanctified. For prasna, 108 cowries are used. The astrologer first touches the cowries while meditating on his mantra and asking for spiritual guidance. Then the astrologer randomly divides the shells into three piles. The astrologer then goes to each pile of cowries and counts off multiples of eight and keeps the remainder; if the remainder is zero then eight cowries are retained. A three digit number is obtained this way and it is the Ashtamangala number of the prasna. The digits are supposed to be indicative of the past, present and future respectfully from left to right. Odd numbers are considered good, even numbers bad.

== Ashtamangala Deva Prasna ==
Ashtamangala Prasna is used to ascertain the unknown causes of unwelcome situations and to plan remedial actions in the life of individuals and also of families. The same process when applied in the context of the life of Hindu places of worship is known as Ashtamangala Deva Prasna. This time, the queries for which answers are sought will be of a different nature. The intention would be to probe the mind of the presiding deity to decide on the activities to be performed that would enhance the spiritual ambiance of the temples. For example, the querist may wish to know whether pujas and festivals are being conducted strictly as per accepted norms, or whether there are any lapses in it, what developmental activities are likely to be pleasing to the deity, and the like.

== See also ==
Paravoor Sreedharan Thanthrikal

Ashtamangala Deva Prashna an article describing the process by Shyamasundara Dasa
