= Daśādhyāyī =

Hindu astrological commentary

- Language: Sanskrit
- Subject: Astrology
- Publication place: India

Dashadhyayi (Devanāgarī: दशाध्यायी, IAST: Daśādhyāyī) is a commentary on the first ten chapters of Varāha Mihira's Bṛhat Jātaka, written in present-day Kerala, India. This text was regularly studied and memorised along with Bṛhat Jātaka and its interpretation of terms readily accepted.

== Authorship ==
Earlier scholars considered the 13th-century author Govinda Bhattathiri alias Govindan to be the author of Daśādhyāyī, and its earlier version Nauka. According to B. V. Raman, Govinda has very intelligently tried to read some secret or hidden meanings into Varāha Mihira's writings other than they would ordinarily imply. However, M. Ramkrishna Bhatt theorized that either the author of Daśādhyāyī was Govinda and the author of Nauka some other writer who is not yet known, or Govinda Bhattathiri did not write Daśādhyāyī.

Recent research suggests that Govinda only wrote Nauka, another commentary of the entire Brihat Jataka text with same style and language during the 13th century. Daśādhyāyī appeared during 15th century with same narrative style but for only ten chapters of Brihat Jataka. It is now evident that Daśādhyāyī is an abridged version of Nauka, rearranged by some teacher of later school. The authorship of the Daśādhyāyī was assigned to Govinda Bhattathiri in the Ithihyamala written by Sankunni during late 19th century.

== Style and influence ==
Daśādhyāyī was primarily written in simple language and style for the benefit of the author's disciples. It is based on experimentation and observation; he has focussed on prediction and profusely quoted sources. He has followed more the views of Sārāvalī on which basis he has also criticized Varāha Mihira. With regard to the value and importance of Daśādhyāyī, which commentary is the foremost amongst the twenty-eight commentaries on Bṛhat Jātaka, Harihara, the author of Praśna Mārga, states that:

Sanskrit: अदृष्ट्वा यो दशाध्यायीं फलमादेष्टुमिच्छति । इच्छत्येव समुद्रस्य तरणं स प्लवं विना ॥३२॥
IAST: adṛṣṭvā yo daśādhyāyīṃ phalamādeṣṭumicchati । icchatyeva samudrasya taraṇaṃ sa plavaṃ vinā ॥32॥

English Translation by B. V. Raman:
“One, who attempts to predict without the Daśādhyāyī, would be like a man trying to cross an ocean without a boat.”

– Praśna Mārga: Importance of Varāhamihira, Śloka 32, Prathamādhyāya - Chapter 1.
