= Garga-samhita (Garga and Bharadvaja) =

Garga-samhita (IAST: Garga-saṃhitā), is an Indian Sanskrit-language text on jyotisha (ancient Indian astrology and astronomy), written as a dialogue between the sages Bharadvaja and Garga. Although attributed to Garga, it was definitely not composed by the ancient astrologer of that name, and can be dated to 6th-7th century CE.

== Date and manuscripts ==
The text is of uncertain date, but was definitely composed after Brahmagupta's Brahma-sphuta-siddhanta (6th-7th century CE). Based on its mathematical contents, Michio Yano dates Garga-samhita to 6th-7th century CE.

The text is known from a manuscript kept at the Vishveshvaranand Vedic Research Institute (VVRI), Hoshiarpur. The VVRI manuscript 2069 was copied by Thakura Datta Joshi and collated by Hariprasada Sharma at Hoshiarpur in 1960.

== Content ==
The text is also known as the "astronomical Garga-samhita" to distinguish it from the "astrological" Gargiya-jyotisha, an earlier text which is also known as Garga-samhita.

Written in the style of the Puranas, the text features a dialogue between the sages Bharadvaja and Garga. It contains 20 chapters: the first four chapters feature Puranic cosmology, and the subsequent chapters discuss mathematical astronomy. The 20 chapters and their topics include:

1. Kālasva-rūpa-vidhāna: time
2. Puruṣa-kṛtyā-disṛṣṭ-ividhā
3. Sakala-jagad-graha-sṛṣṭi-vidhāna: dimensions of the seven worlds (including Jambu), the seven oceans, and the seven underworlds
4. Mṛtyu-graha-cakra-vidhāna: mythological accounts of planets
5. Graha-kaṣyādibhagaṇotpatti-vidhāna: decimal places, circumference of planetary orbits (Moon, Mercury, Venus, Sun, Mars, Jupiter, and Saturn)
6. Graha-madhya-vidhāna: computation of accumulated days since the epoch of the current kalpa
7. Jīvā-janma: derivation of 36 sines
8. Jīvā-vidhā: values of sines and versine
9. Graha-sphuṭī-karma: changes in the size of epicycles according to the quadrant
10. Jīvā-prakalpana: a table of 12 sine values with radius=3438, almost same as the one given by Aryabhatta
11. Laghu-sphuṭa-vihāna: manda (slow) and śīghra (fast) equations
12. Untitled
13. Untitled, explanation of irregular motions of planets using the fast apogee and the slow apogee; description of synodic arcs of five planets
14. Untitled: longitudes of the chief star in the nakshatra
15. Untitled
16. Untitled: Maximum latitudes in minutes for various planets
17. Chāyā-vidhāna: several topics usually dealt with a chapter titled Tri-praśnā-dhyāya in other astronomical texts. For example, raidus of the great circle, longitude of the sun, equinoctial noon hypotenuse etc.
18. Untitled, the conjunction of planets
19. Sūrya-grahaṇa: solar eclipses, longitudinal and latitudinal parallaxes
20. Chedaka: graphical representation of the three-dimensional objects on to a plane surface; briefly discusses lunar eclipses
