= Garga, Republic of Buryatia =

Garga Гарга
- Ulus
- Location within Republic of Buryatia Location within Russia
- Coordinates: 54°25′N 110°36′E
- Country: Russia
- Region: Republic of Buryatia
- District: Kurumkansky District
- Time zone: UTC+8:00

Garga (Russian: Гарга; Buryat: Гаарга, Gaarga) is a rural locality (an ulus) in Kurumkansky District, Republic of Buryatia, Russia. The population was 55 as of 2010.

== Geography ==
Garga is located 38 km northeast of Kurumkan (the district's administrative centre) by road. Zaimka Amatkhan is the nearest rural locality.
