= Shastra =

Sanskrit term for precepts and treatises

Śāstra (Sanskrit: शास्त्र, romanized: Śāstra pronounced [ɕaːstrɐ]) is a Sanskrit word that means "precept, rules, manual, compendium, book or treatise" in a general sense. The word is generally used as a suffix in the Indian literature context, for technical or specialized knowledge in a defined area of practice.

Śāstra has a similar meaning to English -logy, e.g. ecology, psychology, meaning scientific and basic knowledge on a particular subject. Examples in terms of modern neologisms include

1. bhautikaśāstra 'physics',
2. rasaśāstra 'chemistry',
3. jīvaśāstra 'biology',
4. vāstuśāstra 'architectural science',
5. śilpaśāstra 'science of mechanical arts and sculpture',
6. arthaśāstra 'science of politics and economics',
7. nītiśāstra 'compendium of ethics or right policy', and
8. natyasāstra 'art of performing arts.'

In Western literature, Śāstra is sometimes spelled as Sastra, reflecting a misunderstanding of the IAST symbol 'ś', which corresponds to the English 'sh'.

== Etymology ==
The word Śāstra literally means "that which has been instructed/decreed", from the root √śās- which means "instruction/decree" combined with the ṣṭra-suffix.

=== Terminology ===
Śāstra commonly refers to a treatise or text on a specific field of knowledge. In early Vedic literature, the word referred to any precept, rule, teaching, ritual instruction or direction. In late and post Vedic literature of Hinduism, Śāstra referred to any treatise, book or instrument of teaching, any manual or compendium on any subject in any field of knowledge, including religious. It is often a suffix, added to the subject of the treatise, such as

1. Yoga-śāstra
2. Nyāya-śāstra
3. Dharma-śāstra
4. Koka- or Kāma-śāstra,
5. Mokṣa-śāstra
6. Artha-śāstra
7. Alaṅkara-śāstra (rhetoric)
8. Kāvya-śāstra (poetics)
9. Saṅgīta-śāstra (music)
10. Nāṭya-śāstra (theatre & dance)
11. Vyākaraṇa-śāstra (Sanskrit grammar), and others.

In Buddhism, a "śāstra" is often a commentary written at a later date to explain an earlier scripture or sutra. For example, Yutang Lin says that a text written by him and not given by Buddha, cannot be called a "Sūtra"; it is called a "Śāstra". In Buddhism, Buddhists are allowed to offer their theses as long as they are consistent with the Sūtras, and those are called "Śāstras."

In Jainism, the term means the same as in Hinduism. An example of Jaina Śāstra is the 12th-century Yoga Śāstra of Hemchandracharya.

Śāstra is sometimes the root of compounded Sanskrit words. A custodian of Śāstra, for example, is called Śāstradhāri (Sanskrit: शास्त्रधारी).

== References in the early texts ==
The term is found in several passages of the Rigveda (2nd millennium BCE), such as in hymn VIII.33.16.

नहि षस्तव नो मम शास्त्रे अन्यस्य रण्यति ।
यो अस्मान्वीर आनयत् ॥१६॥

— Rigveda 8.33.16,

In this Rigvedic verse, the term means rule or instruction.

The Maitri Upanishad (mid to late 1st millennium BCE), similarly, mentions the materialist Charvakas and Brihaspati who disagreed that the Vedas are a treatise of knowledge, proposing relativism instead, in the following passage:

बृहस्पतिर्वै शुक्रो भूत्वेन्द्रस्याभयायासुरेभ्यः क्षयायेमामविद्यामसृजत्
तया शिवमशिवमित्युद्दिशन्त्यशिवं शिवमिति वेदादिशास्त्रहिंसकधर्माभिध्यानमस्त्विति

— Maitri Upanishad 7.9,

The term is found in other Upanishads as well as in Bhagavad Gita such as in verses 15.20, 16.23–16.24, and 17.1.

The Ṛigvedaprātiśākhya (11.36; 14.30) uses the term Shastra to refer to the prātiśākhya tradition. Kātyāyana, Patañjali and Pāṇini's Aṣṭādhyāyī use the term. Similarly, the Vedāṅgajyotiṣa uses the term to refer to astronomical treatises. The term vedāṅgaśāstrāṇām, refers to the śāstra of the Vedāṅgas.

The term "śāstra" is found in Yaska's Nirukta (1.2, 14), where the reference is to Nirukta (etymology). An early use of the term śāstra with reference to the literature on dharma is found in the vārttika of Kātyāyana, who uses the expression dharmaśāstra

== Chronology and authenticity ==
Shastras are predominantly post-Vedic literature, that is after about 500 BCE. However, it is unclear when various Shastras were composed and completed. The authenticity of the manuscripts is also unclear, as many versions of the same text exist, some with major differences. Patrick Olivelle, credited with a 2005 translation of Manu Dharma-sastra, published by the Oxford University Press, states the concerns in postmodern scholarship about the presumed authenticity and reliability of manuscripts as follows (abridged):

The MDh (Manusmriti) was the first Indian legal text introduced to the western world through the translation of Sir William Jones in 1794. (...) All the editions of the MDh, except for Jolly's, reproduce the text as found in the [Calcutta] manuscript containing the commentary of Kulluka. I have called this as the "vulgate version". It was Kulluka's version that has been translated repeatedly: Jones (1794), Burnell (1884), Buhler (1886) and Doniger (1991). (...) The belief in the authenticity of Kulluka's text was openly articulated by Burnell (1884, xxix): "There is then no doubt that the textus receptus, viz., that of Kulluka Bhatta, as adopted in India and by European scholars, is very near on the whole to the original text."
This is far from the truth. Indeed, one of the great surprises of my editorial work has been to discover how few of the over fifty manuscripts that I collated actually follow the vulgate in key readings.

— Patrick Olivelle, Manu's Code of Law (2005)

The literature of late 1st millennium BCE such as Arthashastra, and Shastras of various fields of knowledge from the early 1st millennium period is of great interest as it helped the emergence of diverse schools and the spread of Indian religions such as Hinduism and Buddhism in and outside South Asia.

The shastras are both descriptive and prescriptive. Among the various Shastras, Manu's code of law has been among the most studied as the colonial British government attempted to establish different laws in British India based on Sharia for Muslims and Manu's code of law.

The shastras are not consistent or single-consensus documents. Dharma-sastras, for example, contain opposing views and contradictory theories. This is in part because they represent an ideal of human behaviour, while at the same time recognising the need to account for likely failings. The shastras do not present life as it was lived. Rather they reveal an idea of what life should be. The shastra texts constitute one of the great bodies of literature of the ancient world.

== Sutra ==
Sutras are another genre of Indian texts that emerged in the 1st millennium BCE, particularly after the 600 BCE. Sutra (literally "binding thread") denotes a type of literary composition distinct from Shastra. In Sanskrit, "sutra" typically referred to one or more aphorisms; hence sutras use short, aphoristic, evocative statements. In contrast, a Shastra is typically longer, with more detail and explanations. An example of a Sutra is Patanjali's Yogasutras (considered a classic Hindu treatise), while an example of Shastra is Hemachandra's Yogasastra (considered a classic Svetambara Jain treatise), both on yoga.

Shastras and Sutras are among the numerous other genres of literature that have survived from ancient and medieval India. Other genres include Vedas, Upanishads, Vedangas, Itihasa, Puranas, Bhasyas, and Subhashitas.

Major Shastras by Topics
Topic	Name of Shastra	Authorship Date	Author	Language	Description/Comments/References
Architecture	Vastu Shastra	Ancient	Various	Sanskrit	Treatise on architecture and design.
Science (Aviation)	Vaimānika Shāstra	Early 20th century	Unknown	Sanskrit	A text on "science of aeronautics".
Religion & Law	Dharma Shastra	1st millennium BCE	Various	Sanskrit	Theological texts on Hindu Dharma, with over 100 different versions.
Eroticism	Kamashastra	Ancient	Various	Sanskrit	Texts related to love and sexuality.
Philosophy	Yoga Vasistha	Ancient	Valmiki	Sanskrit	Philosophical discourse between Sage Vasistha and Lord Rama.
Philosophy	Moksopaya	10th century	Unknown	Sanskrit	Philosophical text, precursor to Yoga Vasistha.
Economics & Politics	Artha Shastra	4th century BCE	Kautilya (Chanakya)	Sanskrit	Treatise on statecraft, economic policy, and military strategy.
Performing Arts	Natya Shastra	200 BCE – 200 CE	Bharata Muni	Sanskrit	Treatise on drama, dance, and music.
Astronomy	Surya Siddhanta	Ancient	Unknown	Sanskrit	An astronomical text with planetary calculations.
Buddhism	Mahayana Buddhist Shastras	Various	Various	Sanskrit	Treatises related to Mahayana Buddhism.
Palmistry & Physiognomy	Samudrika Shastra	Ancient	Unknown	Sanskrit	Text on palmistry, face reading, and body analysis.
Sculpture & Iconography	Shilpa Shastra	Ancient	Various	Sanskrit	Guidelines on sculpture and temple architecture.

== See also ==
- Vaimānika Shāstra
- Dharmaśāstra
- Kamashastra (Kama Shastra)
- Yoga Vasistha
- Mokshopaya (mahayana uttaratantra shastra)
- Arthashastra
- Mahayana sutras
- Samudrika Shastra
- Shilpa Shastras
