= Tajika Neelakanthi =

Hindu astrology text

- Author: Neelakantha
- Language: Sanskrit
- Subject: Astrology
- Publication place: India

Tajika Neelakanthi (IAST: Tājikanīlakaṇṭhī) is a treatise on the predictive part of Hindu astrology written in Sanskrit Slokas by the celebrated authority on Tajika shastra, Neelakantha, son of Ananta Deva, on the basis of many earlier works of Samar Singh and others. He completed this work in the year 1509 Saka or 1587 A.D.

Tajika Neelakanthi is a renowned ancient text that deals with the preparation and reading of Varshaphala Charts as per the Tajika system (one of the three major systems popularly followed in India) in which particular system of prognostication the role assigned to Muntha i.e. the yearly progressed ascendant, is very important. Varshaphala or Annual Horoscopy is one of the many methods employed in India to forecast future events in greater details almost as minute as day to day. The Annual Charts are cast on the basis of the longitude of the Sun at the time of birth to which it returns each year determined by using the Chitrapaksha Ayanamsa. The lagna is calculated according to the time the Sun returns to the same longitude. The use of Muntha and the role of its lord is as important as any one of the three Dashas, the Mudda, the Yogini or the Patayayani, brought into use. The yogas of the Parashari or Jaimini System are not considered, this system has its own set of sixteen yogas whose results along with that of the dashas are to be read with those assigned to the nearly fifty Sahams or special sensitive points.
