= Govinda Bhattathiri =

Indian astrologer (1237–1295)

Govinda Bhaṭṭatiri
- Born: c. 1237; Alathiyur, Malappuram, Kerala
- Died: c. 1295
- Occupation: Astrologer
- Known for: Contributions to Indian astrology
- Notable work: Nauka; Muhurtharathna

Notes
- Paramesvara was a grandson of a disciple of Govinda Bhaṭṭatiri.

Govinda Bhaṭṭathiri (c. 1237–1295), also known as Govinda Bhattathiri of Thalakkulam was an Indian astrologer and astronomer who flourished in Kerala during the thirteenth century CE.

Govinda Bhaṭṭatiri was born in the Nambudiri family known by the name Thalakkulathur in the village of Alathiyur, Tirur in Kerala. He was traditionally considered to be the progenitor of the Pazhur Kaniyar family of astrologers. He is an important figure in the Kerala astrological traditions.

== Works ==
Govinda wrote Nauka, a commentary on Brihat Jataka. Earlier scholars also assigned to him the authorship of Daśādhyāyī, another commentary on Brihat Jataka written with same narrative style. Recent research suggests that Nauka was the original commentary written by Govinda and Daśādhyāyī was an abridged version rearranged by another person in the 15th century. The authorship of the Daśādhyāyī was assigned to Govinda Bhattathiri in the Ithihyamala written by Sankunni during late 19th century. Daśādhyāyī is considered to be the most important of the 70 known commentaries on this text.

Govinda wrote another important work in astrology titled Muhūrttaratnaṃ. Paramesvara (ca.1380–1460), an astronomer of the Kerala school of astronomy and mathematics known for the introduction of the Dṛggaṇita system of astronomical computations, composed an extensive commentary on this work. In this commentary Paramesvara had indicated that he was a grandson of a disciple of the author of Muhūrttaratnaṃ.

== See also ==
- List of astronomers and mathematicians of the Kerala school
