= Tajika Jyotish =

System of Indian astrology

The tājika jyotiṣ, or tājika śastra, that is, the tājika system of astrology, is one of the three systems of Indian astrology as applied to individual charts (horoscopes). The other two systems are the Parāśari and Jaimini systems. The word tājika means a Persian and it indicates the history of the evolution of this system of astrology in India. This system of astrology must have originated in the Islamicized areas to the West of India. It was with Arab invasions of North-West India, from the 7th century onwards, or with the Indian mercantile trade with Persians , Armenians and others, that knowledge of tājika astrology came to India. In 1544 CE, an Indian scholar Neelkantha, son of Shrimad Anant Daivajna translated this system from Arabic/Persian to Sanskrit in his text "Tajika Neelakanthi".

The tājika system attempts to predict in detail the likely happenings in one year of an individual's life. The system goes to such details as to predict events even on a day-by-day basis or even half-a-day. On account of this, this system is also called the varṣaphala system. The term varshaphala means the consequence, effect, or result for one year of the planetary transits at the moment of the solar return. A year under scrutiny begins at the moment when the sun returns to the same longitude as it had at the time of the individual's birth. This moment is called the moment of solar return. The duration between one moment of solar return till the next moment of solar return is the period covered by one annual chart or the varṣa-kunḍali. Such an annual chart was meant to be constructed for every year and examined in detail.

== Special features of tājika astrology ==
The following are some of the features of the tājika astrology that make it distinct from the more popular natal astrology.

- Specified duration: The tājika system is used to predict events during a specified duration, namely, one year.
- Use of transit chart: The system uses the transit chart which shows the transits of various planets at the moment of the solar return.
- Aspects: In the tajika system, the aspects are different from the Parasari system.
- Yogas: the yogas in the tajika system are different from the yogas in the natal horoscopy. There are only sixteen yogas in tajika. Their names are derived from the Persian or Arabic.
- Gender of planets: The attribution of gender to planets in tajika is at variance from that in Parasari system.
- Lord of the year: One of the planets is considered to be the ruler of a particular year and this planet is assumed to significantly influence the events of the year.
- Sahams: A unique feature of the Tajika system is the determination of certain sensitive points or Sahams. Each such sensitive point or Saham is meant to shed light on one particular aspect of life during the year in question. For example, there will be one Saham for marriage as there will be one for child birth.
- The tri-pataki map: This consists of a special charting of various planets as located in the birth chart in relation to the ascendant in the annual chart.
- The muntha: This a sensitive, generally auspicious point, in the annual chart.
