= Dandaneh, Kermanshah =

Dandaneh دندانه
- Village
- Location within Iran
- Coordinates: 34°12′27″N 45°51′35″E
- Country: Iran
- Province: Kermanshah
- County: Gilan-e Gharb
- Bakhsh: Central
- Rural District: Howmeh

Population (2006)
  - Total: 263
- Time zone: UTC+3:30 (IRST)
  - Summer (DST): UTC+4:30 (IRDT)

Dandaneh (Persian: دندانه, also Romanized as Dandāneh; also known as Gargāh, Jūb Dandāneh, and Kargāh) is a village in Howmeh Rural District, in the Central District of Gilan-e Gharb County, Kermanshah Province, Iran. At the 2006 census, its population was 263, in 51 families.
