= Garga (sage) =

Sage in Hinduism

Garga (Sanskrit: गर्ग, romanized: Garga) was an ancient Indian sage who composed a Rigveda hymn. He is also known as Garga Bhāradvāja ("Garga, the descendant of Bharadvaja") to distinguish him from other people of same name.

== Ancestry ==
Katyayana's Sarvanukramani attributes the Rig Veda hymn 6.47 to Garga. This text describes Garga as a son of Bharadvaja Barhaspatya. Katyayana was himself a descendant of Bharadvaja, but appears to have abridged the genealogy between Bharadvaja and Garga.

The epic-Puranic literature suggests that Garga was a distant descendant of Bharadvaja. According to this tradition, Garga was a son of Bhumanyu and a great-grandson of Vidathin Bharadvaja (who was adopted by Bharata Daushyanti). Garga's brothers included Brhatkshatra, Mahavirya, and Nara.

== Descendants ==
According to the epic-Puranic literature, Garga had a son named Shini (IAST: Śini), who was also a sage. Shini's descendants were called Shainyas.

Several later ancient Indian scholars and legendary figures bore the name Garga or other names suggesting their descent from Garga (for example, Gārgya, Gārgi, and Gārgāyanas). This suggests that the descendants of Garga contributed to a number of fields including interpretation of the Vedas, etymology, grammar, astrology, dharmashastra, philosophy, and religion. These people include:

- Bālākī Gārgya and Gārgī Vāchaknavī, mentioned in the Brihadaranyaka Upanishad
- Sūryāyaṇī Gārgya, mentioned in the Prashna Upanishad
- Śarvadatta, Maśaka, and Sthiraka: the Gārgyas mentioned in the Vamsa Brahmana of the Sama Veda
- Kuṇī Gārgya, mentioned in Mahabharata 9.51.3-4
- Kroṣṭuki Gārgya, mentioned in Vayu Purana 34.63
- Kalayani Gargya, mentioned in Vishnu Purana 3.4.26 as a disciple of Bashkali Bharadvaja
- Garga of Mathura, mentioned in Vishnu Purana 5.6.8-9 as the person who performed the naming ceremony of Vasudeva's sons
- Garga, mentioned in the Brahmanda Purana 12.6-11 as the person whose son was killed by Janmajeya
- Gārgya, mentioned in Brahmanda Purana 14.46ff as the father of king Kalayavana
- Garga, mentioned in the Markandeya Purana 18.1-25 as a minister of Kartavirya Arjuna
- Vrddha Garga, to whom several astrological texts are attributed
- Garga, mentioned in Matsya Purana 20.1-10 as the preceptor of Kaushika's sons
- Garga, a student of Lakulisha and the founder of a sub-sect of Pashupata Shaivism.

The Atharvaveda Parisistha 8.15.2 describes the Gargas as Brahmins of Kshatriya ancestry.
