= Hora Ratna =

Hindu astrological text

- Author: Bala Bhadra
- Language: Sanskrit
- Subject: Astrology
- Publication place: India

Hora Ratna, a treatise on the predictive part of Hindu astrology, was written in the usual Sanskrit Slokas - format by Bala Bhadra sometime during the reign of the Muhghal Emperor Shah Jahan. Whereas the opinion of Parashara prevails much more in North of India, in South India the method of Bala Bhadra, who was influenced by Garga, is considered to be more authoritative. This text is a unique treatise on the effects of the twelve signs and houses which aspect it deals in its own peculiar way.
