= Gargiya-jyotisha =

Early Sanskrit astrological treatise

Gargiya-jyotisha (IAST: Gārgīya-jyotiṣa), also known as Garga-samhita (IAST: Garga-saṃhitā), is a 1st-century Indian Sanskrit-language astrological treatise attributed to Garga. The oldest extant text of the Indian astrology (jyotiḥśāstra), it is written in form of a dialogue between Garga and Kraushtuki.

== Date ==
Gargiya-jyotisha is the oldest extant text of the Indian astrology (jyotiḥśāstra), composed around 25 CE.

Mahabharata 13.18.25–26 (Anushasana Parva) refers to the 64 divisions of a work of Garga, a description identical to given in the second chapter of the Garga-jyotisha. This suggests that the work was well-known and widely circulated by the time this portion of Mahabharata was written.

== Manuscripts and translations ==
The name Gargiya-jyotisha ("Jyotisha of Garga") derives from the colophons contained in the text's manuscripts. Mitra-mishra's Viramitrodaya refers to the text as Garga-samhita, a name shared by other texts. Other names for the text include Vṛddha-Garga-saṃhitā and Vṛddha-Gārgīyā-jyotiṣa-saṃhitā.

The text is available from several manuscripts, now at Asiatic Society (Kolkata), Sampurnanand Sanskrit Vishwavidyalaya, National Library of India, Bhandarkar Oriental Research Institute, Gangajala Vidyapeeth (Aliyavada), Trinity College (Cambridge), Banaras Hindu University, Mumbai University, Bibliothèque nationale de France, and Rajasthan Oriental Research Institute (Alwar).

Various scholars have edited and translated parts of these manuscripts:

- Yugapurāṇa (Aṅga 41), edited with an English translation by John Mitchiner (1986)
- Śukracāra (Aṅga 6), translated into English by David Pingree (1987)
- Rāṣṭrotpāta-lakṣaṇa (Aṅga 39), edited with English and Japanese translations by Koji Kumagai (2007, 2011, 2015)
- Puruṣa-lakṣaṇa / Strī-lakṣaṇa (Aṅga 48), edited with an English translation in The Indian System of Human Marks (2016) by Kenneth Zysk

== Content ==
Garga (alias Vṛddha-garga), the author of the text, is considered as one of the most important authors in the jyotisha tradition. The text is in form of a dialogue on astral and other omens between Kraushtuki (called rishi-putra) and Garga.

The text contains the following chapters, called angas (titles in IAST):

1. Karma-guṇā ("Qualities of action"): astrological characters of nakṣatras, tithis, grahas and muhūrtas
2. Candra-mārga ("Course of the Moon")
3. Nakṣatra-kendrabha ("Appearance of the circle of nakṣatras")
4. Rāhu-cāra ("Course of Rāhu")
5. Bṛhaspati-cāra ("Course of Jupiter")
6. Śukra-cāra ("Course of Venus")
7. Ketu-mālā ("Line of Ketu")
8. Śanaiścara-cāra ("Course of Saturn")
9. Aṅgāraka-cāra ("Course of Mars")
10. Budha-cāra ("Course of Mercury")
11. Āditya-cāra ("Course of Sun")
12. Agastya-cāra ("Course of Agastya")
13. Antara-cakra ("Circle of intermediate region")
14. Mṛga-cakra ("Circle of deer")
15. Śva-cakra ("Circle of dogs")
16. Vāta-cakra ("Circle of wind")
17. Vāstu-vidyā ("Knowledge of houses")
18. Aṅga-vidyā ("Knowledge of limbs")
19. Vāyasa-vidyā ("Knowledge of birds")
20. Svāti-yoga ("Conjunction with Svāti")
21. Āṣāḍha-yoga ("Conjunction with Āṣāḍha")
22. Rohiṇī-yoga ("Conjunction with Rohinī")
23. Janapada-vyūha ("Arrangement of countries")
24. Salila ("Rainfall")
25. Graha-kośa ("Collection of planets")
26. Graha-samāgama ("Conjunction of planets")
27. Grahā-mrādakṣiṇyam
28. Graha-yuddha ("Opposition of planets")
29. Graha-śṛṅgāṭaka ("Configuration of planets")
30. Graha-purāṇa ("Purāṇa of planets")
31. Graha-pāka ("Effects of the planets")
32. Yātrā ("Military astrology")
33. Agni-varṇa ("Nature of fire")
34. Senā-vyūha ("Array of battle")
35. Mayūra-citra ("Variegation of peacock")
36. Bhuvana-puṣkara ("Lotus[-model] of the earth")
37. Balyupahāra ("Offering of oblations")
38. Śānti-kalpa ("Rules for propitiation")
39. Rāṣṭrotpāta-lakṣaṇa ("Signs and portents of calamity")
40. Tulā-kośa ("Weighing on balance")
41. Yuga-purāṇa ("Purāṇa of the yugas")
42. Sarva-bhūtaruta ("Cries of all creatures"), . Omens ofvarious birds and animals
43. Vastra-cheda ("Tears in clothes")
44. Bṛhaspati-purāṇa ("Purāṇa of Jupiter")
45. Indra-dhvaja ("Indra’s banner")
46. Aja-lakṣaṇa ("Signs of rams")
47. Kūrma-lakṣaṇa ("Signs of tortoises")
48. Strī-lakṣaṇa ("Signs of women")
49. Gaja-lakṣaṇa ("Signs of elephants")
50. Go-lakṣaṇa ("Signs of cows")
51. Bhārgavasaṃsthāna ("Appearance of Venus")
52. Garbha-saṃsthā ("Appearance of embryos")
53. Dagārgala ("Water-divining")
54. Nirghāta ("Natural destructions")
55. Bhūmi-kampa ("Earthquakes")
56. Pariveṣa ("Halos")
57. Ulkā-lakṣaṇa ("Signs of meteors")
58. Pariveṣa-cakra ("Circle of halos")
59. Ṛtu-svabhāva ("Nature of seasons")
60. Sandhyā-lakṣaṇa ("Signs of twilight")
61. Ulkā-lakṣaṇa ("Signs of meteors")
62. Nakṣatra-puruṣa-kośa ("Compendium on nakṣatra-man")
