= Vrddha Garga =

Ancient Indian scholar

Garga
- गर्ग
- Occupations: astrologer, astronomer
- Known for: Exponent of jyotiḥśāstra
- Notable work: Gargiya-jyotisha

Garga, also known as Vṛddha Garga ("Garga the Elder"), was an ancient Indian scholar of jyotisha. Several Sanskrit-language jyotiḥśāstra works - covering topics such as astrology, astronomy, and divination - are attributed to him. These works were written over several centuries, and are obviously not the work of a single author. Modern scholars generally date the oldest of these works - Gargiya-jyotisha - to the 1st century CE, although the source materials for these works may be much older.

== Biography ==
Garga is also called Vṛddha-Garga ("Garga the Elder") to distinguish him from his later namesakes. He is among the earliest and the most important authors in the jyotisha tradition. Mahabharata 9.36.14-17 describes him as a prominent astrologer who lived at Gargasrota on the banks of the Sarasvati River. Vishnu Purana 2.5.26 states that the mythical serpent Shesha was pleased with Garga and taught him astrology, and thus, Garga became capable of predicting future events by analyzing signs of these events.

The texts attributed to Garga were composed over several centuries. For example, modern scholars generally date Gargiya-jyotisha to the 1st century CE, although the source materials for this text are probably of much earlier origin. On the other hand, the Garga-samhita that features a dialogue between Garga and Bharadvaja was probably composed in 6th-7th century CE. The compilers of the later jyotiḥśāstra texts probably attributed them to Garga because he was an authoritative figure.

References in the Mahabharata suggest that Garga was a well-known scholar. Mahabharata 12.59.117 (Shanti Parva) describes him as an astronomer-astrologer (sāṃvatsara, literally "one who has the knowledge of time"). Mahabharata 13.18.25–26 (Anushasana Parva) refers to the 64 divisions of a work of Garga, a description identical to the one given in the second chapter of the Gargiya-jyotisha. Surya-garbha, a chapter in Narendrayaśas' 585 CE Chinese translation of the Buddhist text Mahasamnipata, describes Garga (jialijia) as a sage who "taught the positions of nakshatras, methods of long and short months and time measurements." Several other works also refer to Garga, including Mina-raja's Vriddha-yavana-jataka (4th century) and the various works of Varahamihira (6th century).

According to David Pingree, much of the material in the works attributed to Garga is derived from Mesopotamian omen literature, but later scholars such as Bill Mak doubt this.

== Works ==
Professor David Pingree has identified 34 distinct jyotisha-related texts which bear a title associated with the name Garga. These texts are certainly not the work of a single author, and cover a wide range of topics including astronomy, horoscopy, planetary omens, and bird divination.

According to Pingree, the following texts include material attributed to Vṛddha-Garga:

1. Gārgīyajyotiṣa (also Vṛddha-Garga-saṃhitā or Vṛddha-Gārgīyā-jyotiṣa-saṃhitā), a 64-chapter dialogue on astral and other omens between Garga and Kraushtuki (called rishi-putra or son of the sage)
2. Garga-saṃhitā, a 37-chapter astrological work that claims to follow Garga's teaching
3. Vṛddha-gārgī-saṃhitā, a dialogue on astrology between Vṛddha-Gārgya (or Vṛddha-Gārgi) and Narada
4. Garga-saṃhitā, a 20-chapter dialogue on astrology and astronomy between Garga and Bharadvaja
5. Gārgya-saṃhitā, a text on astrology, containing at least 12 chapters
6. Uttara-gārgya-saṃhitā or Nārāyaṇīyain, a text containing several chapters, of which only 30-to-51 are extant
7. Several manuscripts titled Garga-saṃhitā, which Pingree could not identify
8. Several short passages claimed to be derived from Garga-saṃhitā - Argha-kāṇḍa, Kākaruta (or Vāyasaruta), Kākavaikṛtya-śānti, Ketūdaya-phala, Jvara-śānti, Dhvajādhyāya, Pallīsaraṭa, and Megha-mālā

As of 2017, none of these works have been edited or published completely.
