= Astrometry =

Branch of astronomy involving positioning and movements of celestial bodies

Using optical interferometry to determine precise positions of stars. Courtesy NASA/JPL-Caltech

Astrometry is a branch of astronomy that involves precise measurements of the positions and movements of stars and other celestial bodies. It provides the kinematics and physical origin of the Solar System and this galaxy, the Milky Way.

== History ==
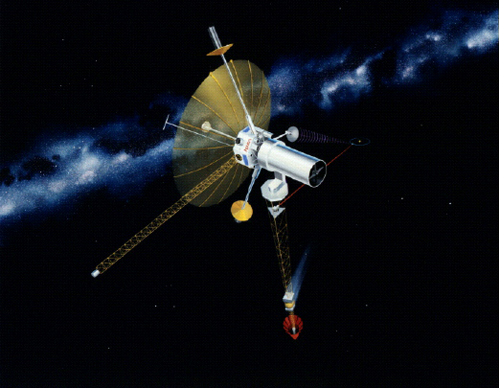
Concept art for the TAU spacecraft, a 1980s era study which would have used an interstellar precursor probe to expand the baseline for calculating stellar parallax in support of Astrometry.

The history of astrometry is linked to the history of star catalogues, which gave astronomers reference points for objects in the sky so they could track their movements. This can be dated back to the ancient Greek astronomer Hipparchus, who around 190 BC used the catalogue of his predecessors Timocharis and Aristillus to discover Earth's precession. In doing so, he also developed the brightness scale still in use today. Hipparchus compiled a catalogue with at least 850 stars and their positions. Hipparchus's successor, Ptolemy, included a catalogue of 1,022 stars in his work the Almagest, giving their location, coordinates, and brightness.

In the 10th century, the Persian astronomer Abd al-Rahman al-Sufi carried out observations on the stars and described their positions, magnitudes and star color; furthermore, he provided drawings for each constellation, which are depicted in his Book of Fixed Stars. Egyptian mathematician Ibn Yunus observed more than 10,000 entries for the Sun's position for many years using a large astrolabe with a diameter of nearly 1.4 metres. His observations on eclipses were still used centuries later in Canadian–American astronomer Simon Newcomb's investigations on the motion of the Moon, while his other observations of the motions of the planets Jupiter and Saturn inspired French scholar Laplace's Obliquity of the Ecliptic and Inequalities of Jupiter and Saturn. In the 15th century, the Timurid astronomer Ulugh Beg compiled the Zij-i-Sultani, in which he catalogued 1,019 stars. Like the earlier catalogs of Hipparchus and Ptolemy, Ulugh Beg's catalogue is estimated to have been precise to within approximately 20 minutes of arc.

In the 16th century, Danish astronomer Tycho Brahe used improved instruments, including large mural instruments, to measure star positions more accurately than previously, with a precision of 15–35 arcsec. Ottoman scholar Taqi al-Din measured the right ascension of the stars at the Constantinople Observatory of Taqi ad-Din using the "observational clock" he invented. When telescopes became commonplace, setting circles sped measurements up.

English astronomer James Bradley first tried to measure stellar parallaxes in 1729. The stellar movement proved too insignificant for his telescope, but he instead discovered the aberration of light and the nutation of the Earth's axis. His cataloguing of 3222 stars was refined in 1807 by German astronomer Friedrich Bessel, the father of modern astrometry. He made the first measurement of stellar parallax: 0.3 arcsec for the binary star 61 Cygni. In 1872, British astronomer William Huggins used spectroscopy to measure the radial velocity of several prominent stars, including Sirius.

Being very difficult to measure, only about 60 stellar parallaxes had been obtained by the end of the 19th century, mostly by use of the filar micrometer. Astrographs using astronomical photographic plates sped the process in the early 20th century. Automated plate-measuring machines and more sophisticated computer technology of the 1960s allowed more efficient compilation of star catalogues. Started in the late 19th century, the project Carte du Ciel to improve star mapping could not be finished but made photography a common technique for astrometry. In the 1980s, charge-coupled devices (CCDs) replaced photographic plates and reduced optical uncertainties to one milliarcsecond. This technology made astrometry less expensive, opening the field to an amateur audience.

In 1989, the European Space Agency's Hipparcos satellite took astrometry into orbit, where it could be less affected by mechanical forces of the Earth and optical distortions from its atmosphere. Operated from 1989 to 1993, Hipparcos measured large and small angles on the sky with much greater precision than any previous optical telescopes. During its 4-year run, the positions, parallaxes, and proper motions of 118,218 stars were determined with an unprecedented degree of accuracy. A new "Tycho catalog" drew together a database of 1,058,332 stars to within 20-30 mas (milliarcseconds). Additional catalogues were compiled for the 23,882 double and multiple stars and 11,597 variable stars also analyzed during the Hipparcos mission. In 2013, the Gaia satellite was launched and improved the accuracy of Hipparcos. The precision was improved by a factor of 100 and enabled the mapping of a billion stars. Today, the catalogue most often used is USNO-B1.0, an all-sky catalogue that tracks proper motions, positions, magnitudes and other characteristics for over one billion stellar objects. During the past 50 years, 7,435 Schmidt camera plates were used to complete several sky surveys that make the data in USNO-B1.0 accurate to within 0.2 arcsec.

== Applications ==
Diagram showing how a smaller object (such as an extrasolar planet) orbiting a larger object (such as a star) could produce changes in position and velocity of the latter as they orbit their common center of mass (red cross).

Motion of barycenter of solar system relative to the Sun

Apart from the fundamental function of providing astronomers with a reference frame to report their observations in, astrometry is also fundamental for fields like celestial mechanics, stellar dynamics and galactic astronomy. In observational astronomy, astrometric techniques help identify stellar objects by their unique motions. It is instrumental for keeping time, in that UTC is essentially the atomic time synchronized to Earth's rotation by means of exact astronomical observations. Astrometry is an important step in the cosmic distance ladder because it establishes parallax distance estimates for stars in the Milky Way.

Astrometry has also been used to support claims of extrasolar planet detection by measuring the displacement the proposed planets cause in their parent star's apparent position on the sky, due to their mutual orbit around the center of mass of the system. Astrometry is more accurate in space missions that are not affected by the distorting effects of the Earth's atmosphere. NASA's planned Space Interferometry Mission (SIM PlanetQuest) (now cancelled) was to utilize astrometric techniques to detect terrestrial planets orbiting 200 or so of the nearest solar-type stars. The European Space Agency's Gaia Mission, launched in 2013, applies astrometric techniques in its stellar census. In addition to the detection of exoplanets, it can also be used to determine their mass.

Astrometric measurements are used by astrophysicists to constrain certain models in celestial mechanics. By measuring the velocities of pulsars, it is possible to put a limit on the asymmetry of supernova explosions. Also, astrometric results are used to determine the distribution of dark matter in the galaxy.

Astronomers use astrometric techniques for the tracking of near-Earth objects. Astrometry is responsible for the detection of many record-breaking Solar System objects. To find such objects astrometrically, astronomers use telescopes to survey the sky and large-area cameras to take pictures at various determined intervals. By studying these images, they can detect Solar System objects by their movements relative to the background stars, which remain fixed. Once a movement per unit time is observed, astronomers compensate for the parallax caused by Earth's motion during this time and the heliocentric distance to this object is calculated. Using this distance and other photographs, more information about the object, including its orbital elements, can be obtained. Asteroid impact avoidance is among the purposes.

Quaoar and Sedna are two trans-Neptunian dwarf planets discovered in this way by Michael E. Brown and others at Caltech using the Palomar Observatory's Samuel Oschin telescope of 48 inches (1.2 m) and the Palomar-Quest large-area CCD camera. The ability of astronomers to track the positions and movements of such celestial bodies is crucial to the understanding of the Solar System and its interrelated past, present, and future with others in the Universe.

== Statistics ==
A fundamental aspect of astrometry is error correction. Various factors introduce errors into the measurement of stellar positions, including atmospheric conditions, imperfections in the instruments and errors by the observer or the measuring instruments. Many of these errors can be reduced by various techniques, such as through instrument improvements and compensations to the data. The results are then analyzed using statistical methods to compute data estimates and error ranges.

== Computer programs ==
- XParallax viu (Free application for Windows)
- Astrometrica (Application for Windows)
- Astrometry.net (Online blind astrometry)

== See also ==
- Astrometric binary
- Barycentric celestial reference system
- Ephemeris
- Equatorium
- Geodetic astronomy
- Gaia spacecraft — launched December 2013
- Hipparcos Space Astrometry Mission (ESA—1989-93)
- International Earth Rotation and Reference Systems Service
- List of astrometric solvers
- Methods of detecting extrasolar planets - Astrometry
- Spherical astronomy
- Celestial cartography
- Star catalogue
- United States Naval Observatory
- United States Naval Observatory Flagstaff Station
- Time standard
