= Star catalogue =

Astronomical catalogue that lists stars and their positions in the sky

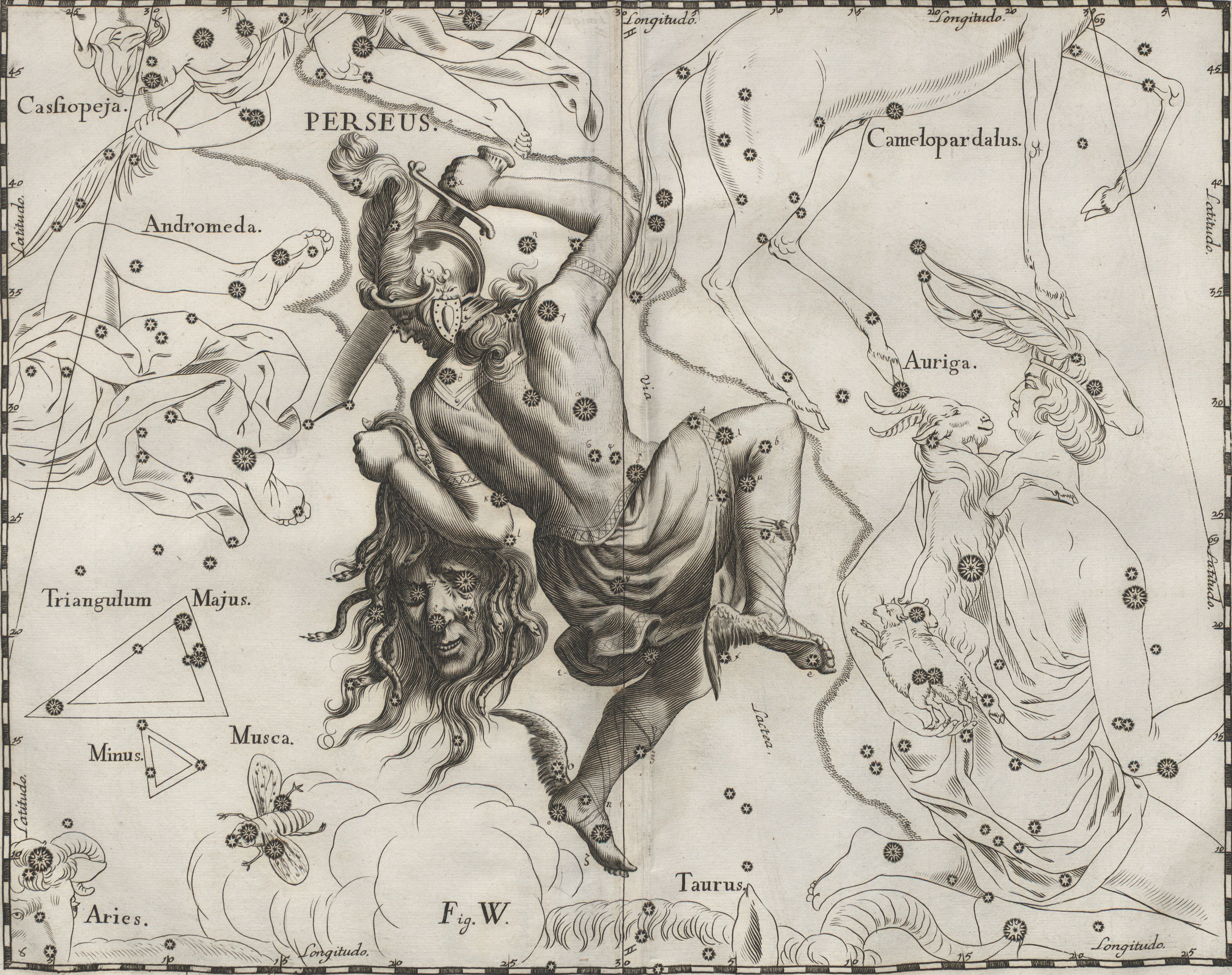
An illustration of the constellation Perseus (after Perseus from Greek mythology) from the star atlas published by the Polish astronomer Johannes Hevelius in 1690

A star catalogue is an astronomical catalogue that lists stars. In astronomy, many stars are referred to simply by catalogue numbers. There are a great many different star catalogues which have been produced for different purposes over the years, and this article covers only some of the more frequently quoted ones. Star catalogues were compiled by a number of different ancient people, including the Babylonians, Greeks, Chinese, Persians, and Arabs. They were sometimes accompanied by a star chart for illustration. Most modern catalogues are available in electronic format and can be freely downloaded from space agencies' data centres. The largest is being compiled from the spacecraft Gaia and thus far has over a billion stars.

Completeness and accuracy are described by the faintest limiting magnitude V (largest number) and the accuracy of the positions.

== Historical catalogues ==
=== Ancient Near East ===
From their existing records, it is known that the ancient Egyptians recorded the names of only a few identifiable constellations and a list of thirty-six decans that were used as a star clock. The Egyptians called the circumpolar star "the star that cannot perish" and, although they made no known formal star catalogues, they nonetheless created extensive star charts of the night sky which adorn the coffins and ceilings of tomb chambers.

Although the ancient Sumerians were the first to record the names of constellations on clay tablets, the earliest known star catalogues were compiled by the ancient Babylonians of Mesopotamia in the late 2nd millennium BC, during the Kassite Period (c. 1531 – c. 1155 BC). They are better known by their Assyrian-era name 'Three Stars Each'. These star catalogues, written on clay tablets, listed thirty-six stars: twelve for "Anu" along the celestial equator, twelve for "Ea" south of that, and twelve for "Enlil" to the north. The Mul.Apin lists, dated to sometime before the Neo-Babylonian Empire (626–539 BC), are direct textual descendants of the "Three Stars Each" lists and their constellation patterns show similarities to those of later Greek civilization.

=== Hellenistic world and Roman Empire ===
In Ancient Greece, the astronomer and mathematician Eudoxus laid down a full set of the classical constellations around 370 BC. His catalogue Phaenomena, rewritten by Aratus of Soli between 275 and 250 BC as a didactic poem, became one of the most consulted astronomical texts in antiquity and beyond. It contained descriptions of the positions of the stars and the shapes of the constellations, and provided information on their relative times of rising and setting.

Approximately in the 3rd century BC, the Greek astronomers Timocharis of Alexandria and Aristillus created another star catalogue. Hipparchus (c. 190 – c. 120 BC) completed his star catalogue in 129 BC, the earliest known attempt to map the entire sky, which he compared to Timocharis' and discovered that the longitude of the stars had changed over time. This led him to determine the first value of the precession of the equinoxes. In the 2nd century, Ptolemy (c. 90 – c. 186 AD) of Roman Egypt published a star catalogue as part of his Almagest, which listed 1,022 stars visible from Alexandria. Ptolemy's catalogue was based almost entirely on an earlier one by Hipparchus. It remained the standard star catalogue in the Western and Arab worlds for over eight centuries. The Islamic astronomer al-Sufi updated it in 964, and the star positions were redetermined by Ulugh Beg in 1437, but it was not fully superseded until the appearance of the thousand-star catalogue of Tycho Brahe in 1598.

The ancient Vedic and other scriptures of India were well aware of the astronomical positions and constellations. Both Mahabharata and Ramayana provide references to various events in terms of the planetary positions and constellations of that time. The Planetary positions at the time of Mahabharata war has been given comprehensively. A discussion about the planetary positions along with specific name of constellations appears in a paper by R N Iyengar in the Indian Journal of History of Science.

=== Ancient China ===
The earliest known inscriptions for Chinese star names were written on oracle bones and date to the Shang dynasty (c. 1600 – c. 1050 BC). Sources dating from the Zhou dynasty (c. 1050 – 256 BC) which provide star names include the Zuo Zhuan, the Shi Jing, and the "Canon of Yao" (堯典) in the Book of Documents. The Lüshi Chunqiu written by the Qin statesman Lü Buwei (d. 235 BC) provides most of the names for the twenty-eight mansions (i.e. asterisms across the ecliptic belt of the celestial sphere used for constructing the calendar). An earlier lacquerware chest found in the Tomb of Marquis Yi of Zeng (interred in 433 BC) contains a complete list of the names of the twenty-eight mansions. Star catalogues are traditionally attributed to Shi Shen and Gan De, two rather obscure Chinese astronomers who may have been active in the 4th century BC of the Warring States period (403–221 BC). The Shi Shen astronomy (石申天文, Shi Shen tienwen) is attributed to Shi Shen, and the Astronomic star observation (天文星占, Tianwen xingzhan) to Gan De.

It was not until the Han dynasty (202 BC – 220 AD) that astronomers started to observe and record names for all the stars that were apparent (to the naked eye) in the night sky, not just those around the ecliptic. A star catalogue is featured in one of the chapters of the late 2nd-century-BC history work Records of the Grand Historian by Sima Qian (145–86 BC) and contains the "schools" of Shi Shen and Gan De's work (i.e. the different constellations they allegedly focused on for astrological purposes). Sima's catalogue—the Book of Celestial Offices (天官書 Tianguan shu)—includes some 90 constellations, the stars therein named after temples, ideas in philosophy, locations such as markets and shops, and different people such as farmers and soldiers. For his Spiritual Constitution of the Universe (靈憲, Ling Xian) of 120 AD, the astronomer Zhang Heng (78–139 AD) compiled a star catalogue comprising 124 constellations. Chinese constellation names were later adopted by the Koreans and Japanese.

=== Islamic world ===
A large number of star catalogues were published by Muslim astronomers in the medieval Islamic world. These were mainly Zij treatises, including Arzachel's Tables of Toledo (1087), the Maragheh observatory's Zij-i Ilkhani (1272), and Ulugh Beg's Zij-i Sultani (1437). Other famous Arabic star catalogues include Alfraganus' A compendium of the science of stars (850) which corrected Ptolemy's Almagest; and al-Sufi's Book of Fixed Stars (964) which described observations of the stars, their positions, magnitudes, brightness, and colour, drawings for each constellation, and the first known description of the Andromeda Galaxy. Many stars are still known by their Arabic names (see List of Arabic star names).

=== Pre-Columbian Americas ===
The Motul Dictionary, compiled in the 16th century by an anonymous author (although attributed to Fray Antonio de Ciudad Real), contains a list of stars originally observed by the ancient Mayas. The Maya Paris Codex also contains symbols for different constellations which were represented by mythological beings.

=== Bayer and Flamsteed catalogues ===
Two systems introduced in historical catalogues remain in use to the present day. The first system comes from the German astronomer Johann Bayer's Uranometria, published in 1603 and regarding bright stars. These are given a Greek letter followed by the genitive case of the constellation in which they are located; examples are Alpha Centauri or Gamma Cygni. The major problem with Bayer's naming system was the number of letters in the Greek alphabet (24). It was easy to run out of letters before running out of stars needing names, particularly for large constellations such as Argo Navis. Bayer extended his lists up to 67 stars by using lower-case Roman letters ("a" through "z") then upper-case ones ("A" through "Q"). Few of those designations have survived. It is worth mentioning, however, as it served as the starting point for variable star designations, which start with "R" through "Z", then "RR", "RS", "RT"..."RZ", "SS", "ST"..."ZZ" and beyond.

The second system comes from the English astronomer John Flamsteed's Historia coelestis Britannica (1725). It kept the genitive-of-the-constellation rule for the back end of his catalogue names, but used numbers instead of the Greek alphabet for the front half. Examples include 61 Cygni and 47 Ursae Majoris.

== Full-sky catalogues (in chronological order) ==
Bayer and Flamsteed covered only a few thousand stars between them. In theory, full-sky catalogues try to list every star in the sky. There are, however, billions of stars resolvable by 21st century telescopes, so this is an impossible goal; with this kind of catalog, an attempt is generally made to get every star brighter than a given magnitude.

=== LAL ===
Jérôme Lalande published the Histoire céleste française in 1801, which contained an extensive star catalog, among other things. The observations made were made from the Paris Observatory and so it describes mostly northern stars. This catalogue contained the positions and magnitudes of 47,390 stars, out to magnitude 9, and was the most complete catalogue up to that time. A significant reworking of this catalogue by followers of Lalande in 1846 added reference numbers to the stars that are used to refer to some of these stars to this day. The decent accuracy of this catalogue kept it in common use as a reference by observatories around the world throughout the 19th century.

=== BD/CD/CPD ===
The Bonner Durchmusterung (German: Bonn sampling) and follow-ups were the most complete of the pre-photographic star catalogues.

The Bonner Durchmusterung itself was published by Friedrich Wilhelm Argelander, Adalbert Krüger, and Eduard Schönfeld between 1852 and 1859. It covered 320,000 stars in epoch 1855.0.

As it covered only the northern sky and some of the south (being compiled from the Bonn observatory), this was then supplemented by the Südliche Durchmusterung (SD), which covers stars between declinations −1 and −23 degrees (1886, 120,000 stars). It was further supplemented by the Cordoba Durchmusterung (580,000 stars), which began to be compiled at Córdoba, Argentina in 1892 under the initiative of John M. Thome and covers declinations −22 to −90. Lastly, the Cape Photographic Durchmusterung (450,000 stars, 1896), compiled at the Cape, South Africa, covers declinations −18 to −90.

Astronomers preferentially use the HD designation (see next entry) of a star, as that catalogue also gives spectroscopic information, but as the Durchmusterungs cover more stars they occasionally fall back on the older designations when dealing with one not found in Draper. Unfortunately, a lot of catalogues cross-reference the Durchmusterungs without specifying which one is used in the zones of overlap, so some confusion often remains.

Star names from these catalogues include the initials of which of the four catalogues they are from (though the Southern follows the example of the Bonner and uses BD; CPD is often shortened to CP), followed by the angle of declination of the star (rounded towards zero, and thus ranging from +00 to +89 and −00 to −89), followed by an arbitrary number as there are always thousands of stars at each angle. Examples include BD+50°1725 or CD−45°13677.

=== HD/HDE ===
The Henry Draper Catalogue was published in the period 1918–1924. It covers the whole sky down to about ninth or tenth magnitude, and is notable as the first large-scale attempt to catalogue spectral types of stars. The catalogue was compiled by Annie Jump Cannon and her co-workers at Harvard College Observatory under the supervision of Edward Charles Pickering, and was named in honour of Henry Draper, whose widow donated the money required to finance it.

HD numbers are widely used today for stars which have no Bayer or Flamsteed designation. Stars numbered 1–225300 are from the original catalogue and are numbered in order of right ascension for the 1900.0 epoch. Stars in the range 225301–359083 are from the 1949 extension of the catalogue. The notation HDE can be used for stars in this extension, but they are usually denoted HD as the numbering ensures that there can be no ambiguity.

=== AC ===
The Catalogue astrographique (Astrographic Catalogue) was part of the international Carte du Ciel programme designed to photograph and measure the positions of all stars brighter than magnitude 11.0. In total, over 4.6 million stars were observed, many as faint as 13th magnitude. This project was started in the late 19th century. The observations were made between 1891 and 1950. To observe the entire celestial sphere without burdening too many institutions, the sky was divided among 20 observatories, by declination zones. Each observatory exposed and measured the plates of its zone, using a standardized telescope (a "normal astrograph") so each plate photographed had a similar scale of approximately 60 arcsecs/mm. The U.S. Naval Observatory took over custody of the catalogue, now in its 2000.2 edition.

=== BS, BSC, HR ===
First published in 1930 as the Yale Catalog of Bright Stars, this catalogue contained information on all stars brighter than visual magnitude 6.5 in the Harvard Revised Photometry Catalogue. The list was revised in 1983 with the publication of a supplement that listed additional stars down to magnitude 7.1. The catalogue detailed each star's coordinates, proper motions, photometric data, spectral types, and other useful information.

The last printed version of the Bright Star Catalogue was the 4th revised edition, released in 1982. The 5th edition is in electronic form and is available online.

=== SAO ===
The Smithsonian Astrophysical Observatory catalogue was compiled in 1966 from various previous astrometric catalogues, and contains only the stars to about ninth magnitude for which accurate proper motions were known. There is considerable overlap with the Henry Draper catalogue, but any star lacking motion data at that time is omitted. The epoch for the position measurements in the latest edition is J2000.0. The SAO catalogue contains this major piece of information not in Draper, the proper motion of the stars, so it is often used when that fact is of importance. The cross-references with the Draper and Durchmusterung catalogue numbers in the latest edition are also useful.

Names in the SAO catalogue start with the letters SAO, followed by a number. The numbers are assigned following 18 ten-degree bands in the sky, with stars sorted by right ascension within each band.

=== USNO-B1.0 ===
USNO-B1.0 is an all-sky catalogue created by research and operations astrophysicists at the U.S. Naval Observatory (as developed at the United States Naval Observatory Flagstaff Station), that presents positions, proper motions, magnitudes in various optical passbands, and star/galaxy estimators for 1,042,618,261 objects derived from 3,643,201,733 separate observations. The data was obtained from scans of 7,435 Schmidt plates taken for the various sky surveys during the last 50 years. USNO-B1.0 is believed to provide all-sky coverage, completeness down to V = 21, 0.2 arcsecond astrometric accuracy at J2000.0, 0.3 magnitude photometric accuracy in up to five colors, and 85% accuracy for distinguishing stars from non-stellar objects. USNO-B is now followed by NOMAD; both can be found on the Naval Observatory server. The entire 50GB compressed catalog can be downloaded via BitTorrent using instructions from Skychart. The Naval Observatory is currently working on B2 and C variants of the USNO catalogue series.

=== GSC ===
The Guide Star Catalog is an online catalogue of stars produced for the purpose of accurately positioning and identifying stars satisfactory for use as guide stars by the Hubble Space Telescope program. The first version of the catalogue was produced in the late 1980s by digitizing photographic plates and contained about 20 million stars, out to about magnitude 15. The latest version of this catalogue contains information for 945,592,683 stars, out to magnitude 21. The latest version continues to be used to accurately position the Hubble Space Telescope.

=== PPM ===
The PPM Star Catalogue (1991) was considered one of the best, both in the proper motion and star position till 1999. Not as precise as the Hipparcos catalogue but with many more stars. The PPM was built from BD, SAO, HD, and more, with sophisticated algorithm and is an extension for the Fifth Fundamental Catalogue, "Catalogues of Fundamental Stars".

=== HIP ===
The Hipparcos catalogue was compiled from the data gathered by the European Space Agency's astrometric satellite Hipparcos, which was operational from 1989 to 1993. The catalogue was published in June 1997 and contains 118,218 stars; an updated version with re-processed data was published in 2007. It is particularly notable for its parallax measurements, which are considerably more accurate than those produced by ground-based observations.

=== Gaia catalogues ===
The Gaia catalogues are based on observations made by the Gaia space telescope. They are released in stages that contain increasing amounts of information; the early releases also miss some stars, especially fainter stars located in dense star fields. Data from every data release can be accessed at the Gaia archive.

Gaia DR1, the first data release based on 14 months of observations made through September 2015, took place on 13 September 2016. The data release includes positions and magnitudes in a single photometric band for 1.1 billion stars using only Gaia data, positions, parallaxes, and proper motions for more than 2 million stars based on a combination of Gaia and Tycho-2 data for those objects in both catalogues, light curves, and characteristics for about 3000 variable stars, and positions and magnitudes for more than 2000 extragalactic sources used to define the celestial reference frame. The second data release (DR2), which occurred on 25 April 2018, is based on 22 months of observations made between 25 July 2014 and 23 May 2016. It includes positions, parallaxes, and proper motions for about 1.3 billion stars and positions of an additional 300 million stars, red and blue photometric data for about 1.1 billion stars and single colour photometry for an additional 400 million stars, and median radial velocities for about 7 million stars between magnitude 4 and 13. It also contains data for over 14,000 selected Solar System objects. The first part of the third data release, EDR3 (Early Data Release 3) was released on 3 December 2020. It is based on 34 months of observations and consists of improved positions, parallaxes, and proper motions of over 1.8 billion objects The full DR3, published in June 2022, includes the EDR3 data plus Solar System data; variability information; results for non-single stars, for quasars, and for extended objects; astrophysical parameters; and a special data set, the Gaia Andromeda Photometric Survey (GAPS). The final Gaia catalogue is expected to be released three years after the end of the Gaia mission.

== Specialized catalogues ==
Specialized catalogues make no effort to list all the stars in the sky, working instead to highlight a particular type of star, such as variables or nearby stars.

=== ADS ===
Aitken's double star catalogue (1932) lists 17,180 double stars north of declination −30 degrees.

=== Carbon stars ===
Stephenson's General Catalogue of galactic Carbon stars is a catalogue of 7000+ carbon stars.

=== Gl, GJ, Wo ===
The Gliese (later Gliese-Jahreiß) catalogue attempts to list all star systems within 20 parsecs (65 ly) of Earth ordered by right ascension (see the List of nearest stars). Later editions expanded the coverage to 25 parsecs (82 ly). Numbers in the range 1.0–915.0 (Gl numbers) are from the second edition, which was

Catalogue of Nearby Stars (1969, W. Gliese).

The integers up to 915 represent systems which were in the first edition. Numbers with a decimal point were used to insert new star systems for the second edition without destroying the desired order (by right ascension). This catalogue is referred to as CNS2, although this name is never used in catalogue numbers.

Numbers in the range 9001–9850 (Wo numbers) are from the supplement

Extension of the Gliese catalogue (1970, R. Woolley, E. A. Epps, M. J. Penston and S. B. Pocock).

Numbers in the ranges 1000–1294 and 2001–2159 (GJ numbers) are from the supplement

Nearby Star Data Published 1969–1978 (1979, W. Gliese and H. Jahreiß).

The range 1000–1294 represents nearby stars, while 2001–2159 represents suspected nearby stars. In the literature, the GJ numbers are sometimes retroactively extended to the Gl numbers (since there is no overlap). For example, Gliese 436 can be interchangeably referred to as either Gl 436 or GJ 436.

Numbers in the range 3001–4388 are from

Preliminary Version of the Third Catalogue of Nearby Stars (1991, W. Gliese and H. Jahreiß).

Although this version of the catalogue was termed "preliminary", it is still the current one as of March 2006, and is referred to as CNS3. It lists a total of 3,803 stars. Most of these stars already had GJ numbers, but there were also 1,388 which were not numbered. The need to give these 1,388 some name has resulted in them being numbered 3001–4388 (NN numbers, for "no name"), and data files of this catalogue now usually include these numbers. An example of a star which is often referred to by one of these unofficial GJ numbers is GJ 3021.

=== GCTP ===
The General Catalogue of Trigonometric Parallaxes, first published in 1952 and later superseded by the New GCTP (now in its fourth edition), covers nearly 9,000 stars. Unlike the Gliese, it does not cut off at a given distance from the Sun; rather it attempts to catalogue all known measured parallaxes. It gives the co-ordinates in 1900 epoch, the secular variation, the proper motion, the weighted average absolute parallax and its standard error, the number of parallax observations, quality of interagreement of the different values, the visual magnitude, and various cross-identifications with other catalogues. Auxiliary information, including UBV photometry, MK spectral types, data on the variability and binary nature of the stars, orbits when available, and miscellaneous information to aid in determining the reliability of the data are also listed.

1952 edition and 1962 supplement. Louise F. Jenkins, Yale University Observatory.
William F. van Altena, John Truen-liang Lee and Ellen Dorrit Hoffleit, Yale University Observatory, 1995.

=== Proper motion catalogues ===
A common way of detecting nearby stars is to look for relatively high proper motions. Several catalogues exist, of which we'll mention a few. The Ross and Wolf catalogues pioneered the domain:

Ross, Frank Elmore, New Proper Motion Stars, eight successive lists, The Astronomical Journal, Vol. 36 to 48, 1925–1939

Wolf, Max, "Katalog von 1053 stärker bewegten Fixsternen", Veröff. d. Badischen Sternwarte zu Heidelberg (Königstuhl), Bd. 7, No. 10, 1919; and multiple lists in Astronomische Nachrichten, 209 to 236, 1919–1929

Willem Jacob Luyten later produced a series of catalogues:

L – Luyten, Proper motion stars and White dwarfs

Luyten, W. J., Proper Motion Survey with the forty-eight inch Schmidt Telescope, University of Minnesota, 1941 (General Catalogue of the Bruce Proper-Motion Survey)

LFT – Luyten Five-Tenths catalogue

Luyten, W. J., A Catalog of 1849 Stars with Proper Motion exceeding 0.5" annually, Lund Press, Minneapolis (Mn), 1955 (A catalogue of 1849 stars with proper motions exceeding 0.5" annually.)

LHS – Luyten Half-Second catalogue

Luyten, W. J., Catalogue of stars with proper motions exceeding 0"5 annually, University of Minnesota, 1979 (LHS catalogue. A catalogue of stars with proper motions exceeding 0"5 annually)

LTT – Luyten Two-Tenths catalogue

Luyten, W. J. Luyten's Two Tenths. A catalogue of 9867 stars in the Southern Hemisphere with proper motions exceeding 0."2 annually, Minneapolis, 1957; A catalogue of 7127 stars in the Northern Hemisphere with proper motions exceeding 0."2 annually, Minneapolis, 1961; also supplements 1961–1962. ()

NLTT – New Luyten Two-Tenths catalogue

Luyten, W. J., New Luyten Catalogue of stars with proper motions larger than two tenths of an arcsecond (NLTT), Univ. of Minnesota, 1979, supplement 1980 (NLTT Catalogue. Volume_III. 0__to -30_.VizieR ???????)

LPM – Luyten Proper-Motion catalogue

Luyten, W. J., Proper Motion Survey with the 48 inch Schmidt Telescope, University of Minnesota, 1963–1981

LP numbers: L in zones −45 to −89 deg.; LP in zones +89 to −44 deg.

Around the same time period, Henry Lee Giclas worked on a similar series of catalogues:

Giclas, H. L., et al., Lowell Proper Motion Survey, Lowell Observatory Bulletin, 1971–1979 (Lowell proper motion survey Northern Hemisphere. The G numbered stars. 8991 stars fainter than magnitude 8 with motions > 0".26/year)

A catalog listing proper motion stars in which entries are listed with a PM HHMMm+DDMMA designation according to the celestial coordinates was also compiled Olin J. Eggen:

Eggen, O. J., Catalogs of proper-motion stars. I. Stars brighter than visual magnitude 15 and with annual proper motion of 1" or more. Astrophys. J., Suppl. Ser., 39, 89-101 (1979)
Eggen, O. J., Catalogs of proper motion stars. II. Stars brighter than visual magnitude 15 and south of declination +30 with annual proper motion between 0"7 and 1"0. Astrophys. J., Suppl. Ser., 43, 457-468 (1980)

The convention has been continued by other astronomers such as Sébastien Lépine and Joshua E. Schlieder, and maintained as a compiled catalog on SIMBAD.

=== Struve Double Star Catalog ===
Friedrich Georg Wilhelm von Struve discovered a large number of double stars and in 1827 published his double star catalogue Catalogus novus stellarum duplicium. For example, binary star 61 Cygni is designated "Struve 2758" or "STF 2758". Stars of his catalogue are sometimes indicated by the Greek letter sigma, Σ. Thus, 61 Cygni is also designated as Σ2758.

=== uvby98 ===
The ubvyβ Photoelectric Photometric Catalogue is a compilation of previously published photometric data. Published in 1998, the catalogue includes 63,316 stars surveyed through 1996.

=== ZC catalogue ===
The Robertson's Zodiacal Catalogue, collected by the astronomer James Robertson, is a catalogue of 3539 zodiacal stars brighter than 9th magnitude. It is mainly used for Star Occultations by the Moon.

=== Successors to USNO-A, etc ===
Stars evolve and move over time, making catalogues evolving, impermanent databases at even the most rigorous levels of production. The USNO catalogues are the most current and widely used astrometric catalogues available at present, and include USNO products such as USNO-B (the successor to USNO-A), NOMAD, UCAC and others in production or narrowly released. Some users may see specialized catalogues (more recent versions of the above), tailored catalogues, interferometrically-produced catalogues, dynamic catalogues, and those with updated positions, motions, colors, and improved errors. Catalogue data is continually collected at the Naval Observatory dark-sky facility, NOFS; and the latest refined, updated catalogues are reduced and produced by NOFS and the USNO. See the USNO Catalog and Image Servers for more information and access.

== See also ==
- List of astronomical catalogues
- Messier object
- New General Catalogue of Nebulae and Clusters of Stars
- Astrometry
- Star chart
- Fixed stars
