= Trepidus =

Trepidus may refer to:

- Trepidation
- Trepidus (music), piano piece of the composer Louis Andriessen
