= 2026 ED138 =

Large trans-Neptunian object

2026 ED_{138}
- 2026 ED_{138} imaged by the Vera C. Rubin Observatory in June 2026

Discovery
- Discovered by: Matthew J. Holman
- Discovery site: Simonyi Survey Telescope; (Vera C. Rubin Observatory)
- Discovery date: 4 March 2026 (first obs.); 13 October 2026 (recognition)

Designations
- Minor planet category: TNO · classical (hot); distant

Orbital characteristics (barycentric)
- Epoch 61203.02256 (MJD TDB)
- Uncertainty parameter 2
- Observation arc: 88.53 yr (32,335 d)
- Earliest precovery date: 30 December 1937
- Aphelion: 49.07 AU
- Perihelion: 37.11 AU
- Semi-major axis: 43.09105±0.00016 (Note: A semi-major axis of 43 AU is near the 7:12 resonance with Neptune.) AU
- Eccentricity: 0.138738±0.000003
- Orbital period (sidereal): 282.68 years; 103,250 days
- Mean anomaly: 127.57815±0.00159 °
- Mean motion: 0° 0^{m} 12.606^{s} / day
- Inclination: 24.433894±0.000006 °
- Longitude of ascending node: 322.60591±0.00002 °
- Time of perihelion: 18 April 1926; 13 April 2209
- Argument of perihelion: 168.70335±0.00128 °
- Neptune MOID: 6.86 AU (1.03 billion km)

Physical characteristics
- Mean diameter: 635–1,590 km (390–990 mi) (Note: for assumed albedo and absolute magnitude H = 3.11); 612–968 km (380–600 mi) (Note: for likely albedos and absolute magnitude H = 3.19)
- Synodic rotation period: tentative 1.18077 d (28.33848 h): tentative 10.4 h (single-peaked); 20.7 h (double-peaked)
- Geometric albedo: 0.04–0.25 (assumed); 0.10–0.25 (likely) (Note: Most known large TNOs have albedos of approximately 0.10 or higher.); ≲0.5
- Temperature: 41.8–44.1 K (equivalent); 44.0–45.6 K (perihelion)
- Spectral type: u–g = 1.55±0.09; g–r = 0.63±0.07 (Note: The color index g–r = 0.63 represents the difference between the object's apparent magnitudes in the Sloan Digital Sky Survey g (blue) and r (red) filters. 2026 ED_{138} is redder than the Haumea family.); r–i = 0.26±0.05; i–z = 0.12±0.06; z–y = 0.08±0.07; V–J = 1.71±0.08; J–H = 0.60±0.15; H–K_{s} = 0.01±0.27; V–I = 0.930±0.026; BR
- Apparent magnitude: 19.4 (V band) (Note: The V band covers the visible spectrum. 2026 ED_{138}'s red color makes it appear brighter in longer (redder) wavelengths: for example it has an apparent magnitude of 19.4 and absolute magnitude of 2.61±0.04 in the near-infrared i-band.)
- Absolute magnitude (H): 3.154±0.035

2026 ED_{138} is a large trans-Neptunian object (TNO) and possible dwarf planet in the classical Kuiper belt. It was discovered by Matthew Holman on 13 October 2026, while searching through Vera C. Rubin Observatory data taken earlier that year, with its earliest precovery in 1937.

With an absolute magnitude of about 3.1, it is the brightest TNO found since Chiminigagua in 2013 and approximately tied with Chiminigagua as the ninth intrinsically-brightest known TNO, and the brightest known object in the Solar System without a directly measured size. Its diameter is likely between 600 and 1,000 kilometers (400 and 600 mi), potentially making it among the largest known dwarf planet candidates. Despite its brightness, it had long evaded discovery due to a notably southern declination (Note: The 4 March 2026 image had a very southernly declination of –42°. In 2017 the declination was even farther south at –45°. Palomar all-sky surveys cannot see this far south.) and its location near the crowded Galactic plane.

It is moderately red, indicating that it likely has an icy surface darkened by organic material such as tholins.

== Discovery ==
2026 ED_{138} was discovered by Matthew Holman on 13 October 2026, while searching through Vera C. Rubin Observatory data taken earlier that year. The search made use of a computer program that Holman co-developed with Kevin Napier to automatically identify moving objects in images. Upon discovering 2026 ED_{138}, Holman recognized that it was unusually bright (apparent magnitude 20) and prompted further searches of earlier images. Mario Jurić uncovered 20 more Rubin images of 2026 ED_{138} going back to 4 March 2026, while the B612 Asteroid Institute uncovered images taken by the Cerro Tololo Inter-American Observatory's Dark Energy Camera (DECam) from 2016 to 2019. With over 10 years of collected observations, the Minor Planet Center (MPC) and the Vera C. Rubin Observatory team jointly announced the discovery of 2026 ED_{138} on 27 October 2026.

On the day after the announcement, the MPC reported earlier observations taken by the Chilean VISTA telescope (Note: VISTA is represented by observatory code W91 in the Minor Planet Center's database.) from 2010 to 2011. At the same day, it was reported that it was also seen in TESS observations between 2019 and 2026. They show a decline of 0.08 magnitudes, expected for an object moving away, and changing phase angle. One day after that, the MPC reported even earlier observations found in Digitized Sky Survey images from 1937 to 2000. The earliest of these precovery observations was taken from Boyden Observatory in South Africa. (Note: Boyden Observatory is represented by observatory code 074 in the Minor Planet Center's database.) With over 88 years of recorded observations (spanning 31% of its orbital period (Note: 31% comes from dividing 2026 ED_{138}'s observation arc by its orbital period.)), 2026 ED_{138} has the longest observation arc of any trans-Neptunian object besides Pluto. A paper by Mróz et al. shows that it has been precovered by OGLE between 2011 and 2024, and it has 102 reliable detections by the telescope.

2026 ED_{138} was found in a region of sky close to the plane of the Milky Way, where it is crowded with stars. Even though it is among the brightest known trans-Neptunian objects, it had evaded detection for a long time because it is often obscured by background stars and its location has not been frequently observed by telescopes. The discovery of 2026 ED_{138} was made possible by the Rubin Observatory's frequent monitoring of the entire southern celestial hemisphere and the use of computer algorithms for searching Rubin's large dataset. It is believed that there may be more undiscovered large objects lying within 10° of the Galactic plane.

Gallery of Vera C. Rubin Observatory images of 2026 ED_{138} taken during 2026

2026 ED_{138}'s path in the sky from 1 to 31 May 2026

Precovery of 2026 ED_{138} from ESO Schmidt plates

Precovery of 2026 ED_{138} from the VVV survey of the 2000s

== Name ==
2026 ED_{138} is the provisional designation of this object, given by the Minor Planet Center upon announcing its discovery. The provisional designation includes the year of the object's discovery (2026), the half-month of its discoverer's first observation date (E = first half of March), and the order of its discovery after other minor planets found during this half-month (D_{138} = 3,454th minor planet discovered). (Note: Following the procedure described by the Minor Planet Center's provisional designation documentation, the discovery order is calculated by multiplying the subscripted number by 25 (138 × 25 = 3,450) and then adding it with the second letter's place in the alphabet (D = 4; 3,450 + 4 = 3,454).) Minor planets eventually receive a permanent catalog number once their orbits are sufficiently known to be recoverable, a criterion that 2026 ED_{138} has already passed. It is only after receiving a permanent number that minor planets can be named.

2026 ED_{138} is a classical trans-Neptunian object. The International Astronomical Union gives these types of objects mythological names, preferably those associated with creation myths.

== Orbit ==
2026 ED_{138} is a trans-Neptunian object (TNO), orbiting the Sun beyond Neptune at an average distance of 43 AU (6.4 billion km; 4.0 billion mi). It resides in the Kuiper belt, where many other TNOs and dwarf planets like Pluto are found. It follows an elliptical and tilted orbit with an eccentricity of 0.14 and an inclination of almost 25° with respect to the ecliptic. These orbital characteristics make 2026 ED_{138} a "hot" classical Kuiper belt object, which implies that it was disturbed from its original orbit through gravitational interactions with Neptune.

In its elliptical orbit, 2026 ED_{138} approaches within 37.1 AU of the Sun at perihelion and strays as far as 49 AU from the Sun at aphelion. It takes roughly 283 years for 2026 ED_{138} to complete one orbit around the Sun, in a weak (transitory) 7:12 mean-motion orbital resonance with Neptune, like the dwarf planet Haumea. Despite having similar orbits, 2026 ED_{138} is likely not related to Haumea and its family due to their different surface colors. As of October 2026, it is at a distance of roughly 46 AU from the Sun. It last came to perihelion in April 1926, and will return to perihelion in April 2209.

Diagram showing the orbits of 2026 ED_{138} (blue) and the other dwarf planets (yellow), seen at an angle from the ecliptic.

Another diagram of the orbits of 2026 ED_{138} (blue) and the other dwarf planets (yellow), seen from the direction of the Solar north pole.

== Physical characteristics ==
Artist's impression of 2026 ED_{138}, as well as the labelled orbits of planets (blue) and dwarf planets (purple)

=== Size, brightness and albedo ===
The diameter of 2026 ED_{138} has not been measured but is inferred to be between 600 and 1,500 km (400 and 900 mi) based on the object's absolute visual magnitude of 3.19±0.04 per Rubin Observatory estimates. A study led by Joseph Murtagh found an absolute magnitude of 3.11±0.05 using different means. A paper using data from OGLE finds an absolute magnitude of 3.154±0.035 in the V-band and 2.224±0.034 in the I band. With these absolute magnitudes, 2026 ED_{138} is approximately tied with Chiminigagua as the ninth brightest known TNO.

The unknown diameter of 2026 ED_{138} stems from its unknown albedo or reflectivity: if it has a dark surface, it should be at the large end of its estimated size range, whereas if it has a bright surface, it should be at the small end. (Note: The relationship between a Solar System body's diameter (D), albedo (p), and absolute magnitude (H) is mathematically written as $D = \frac{1329 \mathrm{km}}{\sqrt{p}} \times 10^{-0.2H}$ (see Absolute magnitude#Solar System bodies (H)). What this equation shows is that the diameter must be small if the albedo is high, and conversely the diameter must be large if the albedo is low.) Icy bodies in the upper end of this size range are expected to be rounded by their gravity, so 2026 ED_{138} is a dwarf planet candidate—potentially among the largest known. Furthermore, its shape is thought to be approximately spheroidal. Its minimum likely diameter (at H = 3.27 and albedo = 0.25) would be comparable to that of Eris' moon Dysnomia, (Note: Dysnomia's diameter is measured to be 615 km, which is close to 2026 ED_{138}'s minimum diameter of 612 km.) while its maximum likely diameter (at H = 3.01 and albedo = 0.04) would be greater than that of Haumea. If its albedo were 0.10, seen in several large TNOs, and H = 3.154, its diameter would be 980 km (610 mi), larger than Ceres. A diameter between 610 and 970 km (H = 3.19 and albedo = 0.25–0.10) has been estimated as likely. Due to its low amount of methane ice, its diameter is unlikely to be below ∼450 km.

The JPL Small-Body Database estimates the object's absolute magnitude as 2.85±0.23, based on potentially faulty color corrections. Michael E. Brown considers 2026 ED_{138} a near-certain dwarf planet, using the Minor Planet Center's also potentially faulty color corrections with an absolute magnitude estimate of 2.9 (rounded from 2.93) and an assumed albedo of 0.14.

Future observations of 2026 ED_{138} through infrared and stellar occultations will allow for a more accurate measurement of its size. Furthermore, high-resolution imaging by space telescopes such as James Webb may reveal whether 2026 ED_{138} is orbited by a natural satellite, which could allow for the measurement of its mass. Regardless of its size, 2026 ED_{138} is unlikely to hold an atmosphere containing either methane, carbon monoxide, or nitrogen because it would entirely escape from its surface over the age of the Solar System. The theoretical albedo limit for retaining carbon monoxide is <0.037, with nitrogen's retention albedo limit being <0.033.

With an apparent magnitude of 19.4 or 19.7, 2026 ED_{138} is bright enough to be located and imaged by very capable amateurs in the Southern Hemisphere with high-end astrophotography equipment utilizing plate solving and a guide star.

=== Surface and spectra ===
==== Surface composition and color ====
2026 ED_{138} has measured color indices of u–g = 1.55±0.09, g–r = 0.63±0.07, r–i = 0.26±0.05, i–z = 0.12±0.06, and z–y = 0.08±0.07. It is redder than TNOs of the Haumea family, which have bright gray surfaces. According to Mario Jurić, "it's quite red, which points to an icy surface darkened by organic material." Murtagh's paper classifies it as a BR-colored object (intermediate blue-red), with color indices of V-J of 1.71±0.08; J-H of 0.60±0.15; and H-K_{s} of 0.01±0.27.

These color indices show it has a slope of 12% per 100 nm, making it unlikely to house water ice on its surface at roughly 95% confidence. This makes it likely that less than 15% of the surface area has albedo of 0.15. This also supports the idea that it is not a Haumea-family object. Using g-r and r-i color indices to predict the z-band by fitting a linear reflectance continuum, shows that limits Eris-like methane to less than 25% of the surface. This makes it unlikely to have an albedo over 0.5. 2026 ED_{138} is likely too small and warm to retain methane on its surface.

A paper using OGLE observations gives a V-I of 0.930±0.026, and further confirming that it is a BR-colored object.

A paper by Hsing Wen Lin using observations by DECam and Rubin, shows color indices of: g-r of 0.63±0.02; r-i of 0.26±0.02; i-z of 0.11±0.01; and z-y 0.09±0.04. He has also measured the absolute magnitude in the u-band to be 5.02±0.05, but he has not calculated any color indices using the u-band.

==== Spectrum ====
In the same paper by Hsing Wen Lin, he uses the known photometry as he measured above, to make a reconstructed spectum using a spectral-manifold prior of 2026 ED_{138}. He predictes a spectum from 0.4 to 5.1 μm, and that it is a water-type TNO normal for classical Kuiper belt objects.

=== Photometry and shape ===
2026 ED_{138} rotates once on its axis every 10.4 hours if single-peaked or 20.7 hours if double-peaked, though alternative possible rotation periods, 7.2 h and 18.2 hours are not excluded. The light curve amplitude of the object is likely 0.11 to 0.15. Because precovery images are consistent with the current phase curve, 2026 ED_{138} is unlikely to be significantly flattened. A paper using OGLE observations, reports a tentative rotation period of 1.18077 days and its 1-day alias of 0.54066 days, but the low signal-to-noise ratio makes this tentative.

== Origin ==
The hot classical Kuiper belt objects like 2026 ED_{138} are believed to have been scattered by Neptune's gravitational influence during the Solar System's early history. 2026 ED_{138}'s orbital position matches with the Haumean family group very well, but 2026 ED_{138} has a red surface spectrum and not a water-ice surface, makes it likely that 2026 ED_{138} is an interloper that did not originate from the Haumea family impact.
