= Astrometric solving =

Astronomical technique

Astrometric solving or plate solving or astrometric calibration of an astronomical image is a technique used in astronomy and applied on celestial images. Solving an image is finding match between the imaged stars and a star catalogue. The solution is a math model describing the corresponding astronomical position of each image pixel. The position of reference catalogue stars has to be known to a high accuracy so an astrometric reference catalogue is used such as the Gaia catalogue. The image solution contains a reference point, often the image centre, image scale, image orientation and in some cases an image distortion model.

With the astrometric solution it is possible to:

- Calculate the celestial coordinates of any object on the image.
- Synchronize the telescope mount or satellite pointing position to the center of the image taken.

In the past, plate solving was done manually by accurately measuring photographic glass plates taken with an astrograph (astrographic camera)

Currently, astrometric solving is exclusively done by software programs. The program extracts the star x,y positions from the celestial image, groups them in three-star triangles or four-star quads. Then it calculates for each group a geometric hash code based on the distance and/or angles between the stars in the group. It then compares the resulting hash codes with the hash codes created from catalogue stars to find a match. If it finds sufficient statistically reliable matches, it can calculate transformation factors. The solver should be fast and reliable with no false matches.

There are several conventions to model the transformation from image pixel location to the corresponding celestial coordinates. The simplest linear model is called the World Coordinate System. A more advanced convention is SIP (Simple Imaging Polynomial) describing the transformation in polynomials to cope with non-linear geometric distortion in the celestial image, mainly caused by the optics.

== Applications ==
- Astrometry. Professional setups are using astrometric solving to measure accurately the position of minor planets or comets to calculate orbital parameters.
- Telescope mount pointing. Astrometric solving is used for pointing the telescope mount accurately by syncing it to the celestial position of the image center.

== Blind solving ==
Some programs do not need an initial guess and can do a so called blind solving. They will solve any image having sufficient imaged stars as reference.

== See also ==
- List of astrometric solvers
