= Al-Adami =

Astronomer of medieval Islam

- أبو علي الحسين بن محمد الآدمي
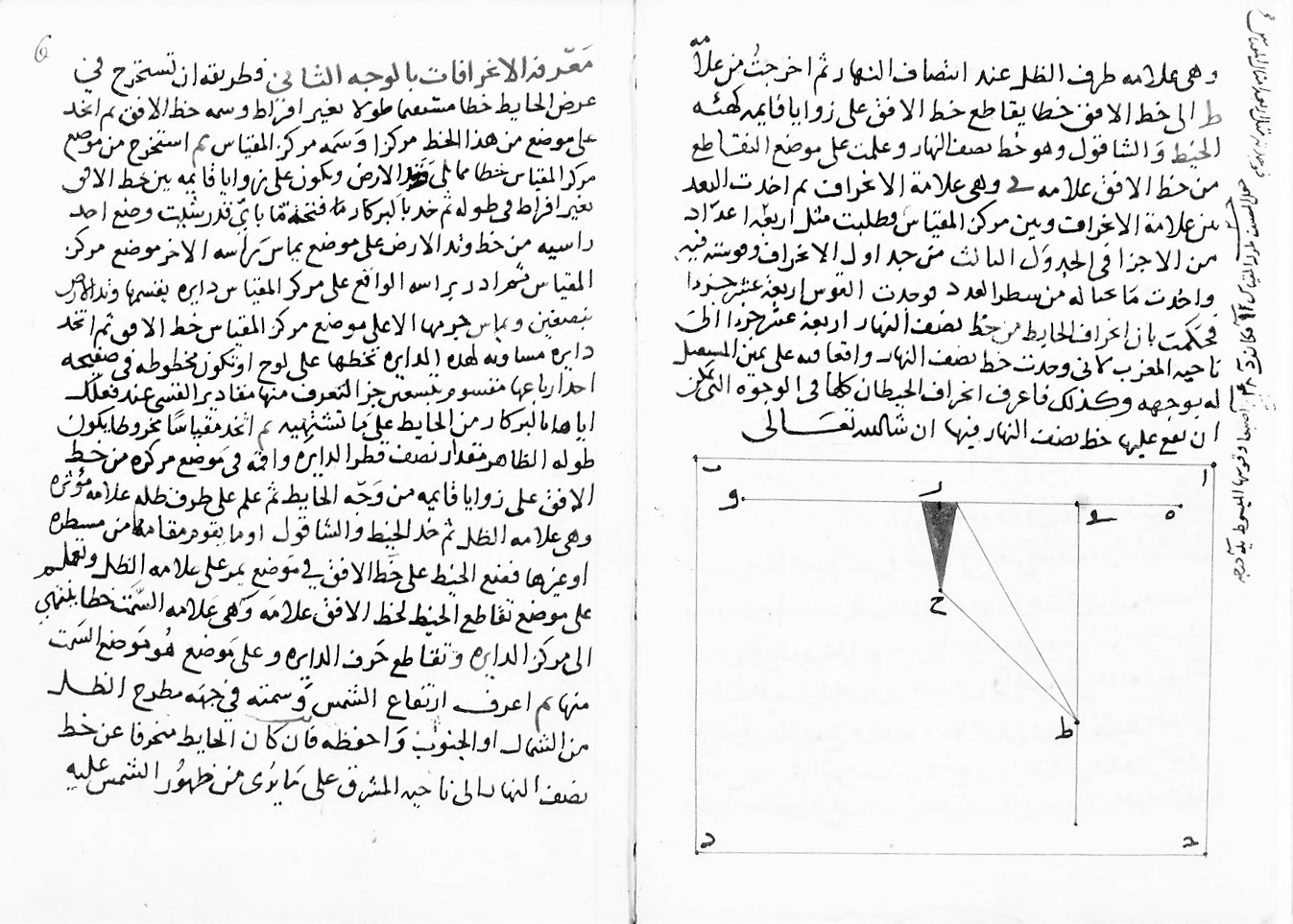
- A page from Techniques, Walls, and the Making of Sundials
- Born: fl. c. 925

Academic work
- Era: Islamic Golden Age
- Main interests: Maker of scientific instruments
- Notable works: Kitab takhlTt al-sa v at wa inhiraf al-hTtan wa’l-zilalat wa alTad al-sumut

ʿAbū ʿAlī al-Ḥusayn ibn Muḥammad al-Ādamī (Arabic: أبو علي الحسين بن محمد الآدمي; flourished in Baghdad c. 925) was a maker of scientific instruments who wrote an extant work on vertical sundials, Techniques, Walls, and the Making of Sundials (Kitab takhlTt al-sa v at wa inhiraf al-hTtan wa’l-zilalat wa alTad al-sumut). The manuscript, which is held in the Bibliothèque nationale de France, contains tables that enabled the drawing of lines to show any desired angle of latitude. The surviving copy of al-Adami's 10th-century manuscript (Arabe 2506,1 (fols. 1r-62r) dates from the 15th century, which King has suggested was written either by al-Adami or by a contemporary, Sa'id ibn Khafif al-Samarqandi. The tables on folios. 31v–33v were intended to be used in the construction of a vertical sundial.

According to the polymath al-Biruni, al-Adami was the first to demonstrate solar and lunar eclipses using a "disc of eclipses". Al-Adami was named in the Fihrist, written by the 10th century scholar Ibn al-Nadīm.

The astronomer Ibn al-Adami, who is thought by scholars to have been al-Adami's son, wrote Naẓm al-ʿiqd (now lost), a zīj that used information obtained from the Sindhind, an Indian source translated into Arabic by the 8th century mathematician and astronomer Ibrāhīm al-Fazārī. The Naẓm al-ʿiqd was first published in 949/950.

== Sources ==
- Dodge, Baynard, ed. (1970). The Fihrist of al-Nadim: a Tenth-Century Survey of Muslim Culture. Translated by Dodge, Baynard. New York: Columbia University Press. ISBN 978-02310-2-925-4.
- Jamil Ragep, F.; Bolt, Marvin (2007). "Ādamī: Abū ʿAlī al-Ḥusayn ibn Muḥammad al-Ādamī". In Thomas Hockey; et al. (eds.). The Biographical Encyclopedia of Astronomers. New York: Springer. ISBN 9780387310220. (PDF version)
- King, David A. (2004). Daiber, H.; Pingree, D. (eds.). In Synchrony With The Heavens: Studies In Astronomical Timekeeping And Instrumentation In Medieval Islamic Civilization. Islamic Philosophy, Theology, And Science. Vol. 1: The Call of the Muezzin. Leiden: Brill Publishers. ISBN 90-04-12233-8.
- Rosenfeld, B. A.; Ekmeleddin, Ihsanoğlu (2003). Mathematicians, Astronomers, and Other Scholars of Islamic Civilization and Their Works (7th–19th c.). Series of Studies and Sources on (the) History of Science. Istanbul: Research Centre for Islamic History, Art and Culture (IRCICA). ISBN 92-9063-127-9.
