= Ibn al-Adami =

Islamic astronomer

- Scientific career
- Fields: Astronomy

Ibn al‐Ādamī (flourished in Baghdad, c. 925), was a 10th-century Islamic astronomer who wrote an influential work of zij based on Indian sources. The book, now lost, uses the Indian methods found in the Sindhind. The 11th-century historian Sa'id al-Andalusi informs us that the theory of trepidation that became known to Europe and was ascribed to Thabit ibn Qurra can be found instead in the Zij of Ibn al-Adami, who himself may have known of this theory from Thabit's grandon, Ibrahim ibn Sinan. Ibn al-Adami is also the source for the story of how Indian astronomy reached the court of Caliph al-Mansur in the early 770s in Baghdad.

Presumably, he is the son of Al-Adami.
