= 532037 Chiminigagua =

Large object in the scattered disc

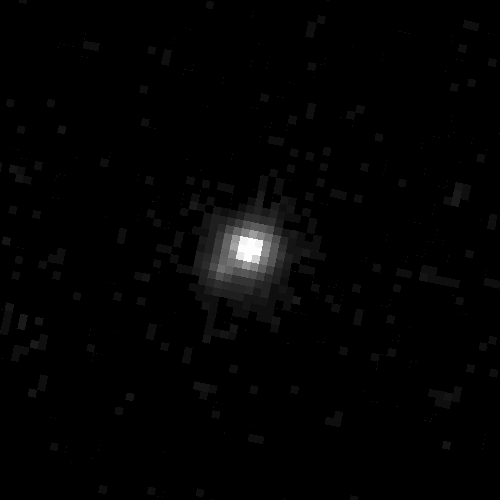
- Chiminigagua (center) and its moon (bottom left), imaged by the Hubble Space Telescope on 15 January 2018

Discovery
- Discovered by: Scott S. Sheppard; Chad Trujillo
- Discovery site: Cerro Tololo Obs. (DECam)
- Discovery date: 17 March 2013

Designations
- Pronunciation: /ˌʃɪmɪniˈɡɑːɡwə/ or /ˌtʃɪ-/ (with the PASTA vowel)
- Named after: Chiminigagua
- Alternative designations: 2013 FY_{27}
- Minor planet category: TNO; SDO; distant

Orbital characteristics (barycentric)
- Epoch 25 February 2023 (JD 2460000.5)
- Uncertainty parameter 3 or 4
- Observation arc: 13.94 yr (5,093 d)
- Earliest precovery date: 15 March 2011
- Aphelion: 82.000 AU
- Perihelion: 35.572 AU
- Semi-major axis: 58.786 AU
- Eccentricity: 0.3949
- Orbital period (sidereal): 450.43 yr (164,520 d)
- Mean anomaly: 216.561°
- Mean motion: 0° 0^{m} 7.878^{s} /day
- Inclination: 33.121°
- Longitude of ascending node: 187.053°
- Time of perihelion: ≈ 31 October 2202 ±10 days
- Argument of perihelion: 139.207°
- Known satellites: 1

Physical characteristics
- Mean diameter: 742+78 −83 km (Note: 742+78 −83 km is the estimated diameter of Chiminigagua by itself, if it and its moon have equal albedos (equally reflective surfaces). It is important to take the moon's albedo into account because the moon slightly adds to Chiminigagua's total brightness, which makes the object appear slightly brighter and bigger than it actually is (e.g. resulting in an "effective" diameter of 765+80 −85 km).)
- Geometric albedo: 0.170+0.045 −0.030
- Temperature: 22 K (perihelion) to 16 K (aphelion)
- Spectral type: moderately red; V–R = 0.56±0.03; R–I = 0.52±0.03
- Apparent magnitude: 22.5
- Absolute magnitude (H): 3.15±0.03

532037 Chiminigagua (provisional designation 2013 FY_{27}) is a large trans-Neptunian object located in the scattered disc. It was discovered on 17 March 2013 by Scott Sheppard and Chad Trujillo at Cerro Tololo Observatory in Chile. Chiminigagua has a diameter of about 740 km (460 mi), which is large enough that some astronomers consider it a possible dwarf planet. With an absolute magnitude of about 3.15, it is the ninth- intrinsically brightest known TNO, approximately tied with 2026 ED138.

Chiminigagua, like many other trans-Neptunian objects, has a moderately red color, which suggests it has an old, ice-poor surface that has been dulled by cosmic rays and micrometeoroid bombardment. It has one unnamed moon about 190 km (120 mi) in diameter, which is believed to have formed from a giant impact on Chiminigagua.

== History ==
=== Discovery ===
Chiminigagua was discovered by Scott Sheppard and Chad Trujillo on 17 March 2013, during a search for distant trans-Neptunian objects (TNOs). Their search was performed using the 4.0-meter Víctor M. Blanco Telescope's Dark Energy Camera (DECam) at Cerro Tololo Observatory in Chile, which repeatedly imaged large portions of the sky to reveal TNOs as slow-moving objects. Sheppard and Trujillo had been searching for TNOs using other telescopes since 2007, but they switched to primarily using DECam when it became operational in 2012.

From May 2013 to March 2014, Sheppard and Trujillo reobserved Chiminigagua using DECam and the 6.5-meter Magellan–Baade Telescope in Las Campanas Observatory, Chile. The Minor Planet Center announced the discovery of Chiminigagua on 31 March 2014 and gave it the minor planet provisional designation 2013 FY_{27}.

Before Chiminigagua, Sheppard and Trujillo had discovered several large TNOs with DECam—namely, the sednoid 2012 VP113 and the scattered disc object 2013 FZ_{27}, which were announced along with Chiminigagua within a week of one another in late March to early April 2014. When Chiminigagua was discovered, it was nearly at its farthest point from the Sun (aphelion) in its orbit. This made Chiminigagua appear dim with an apparent magnitude of 22 from Earth. Because of its faintness, Chiminigagua likely evaded discovery by earlier, less sensitive TNO searches. Chiminigagua has been identified in precovery observations by the Pan-STARRS survey from March 2011 to February 2013.

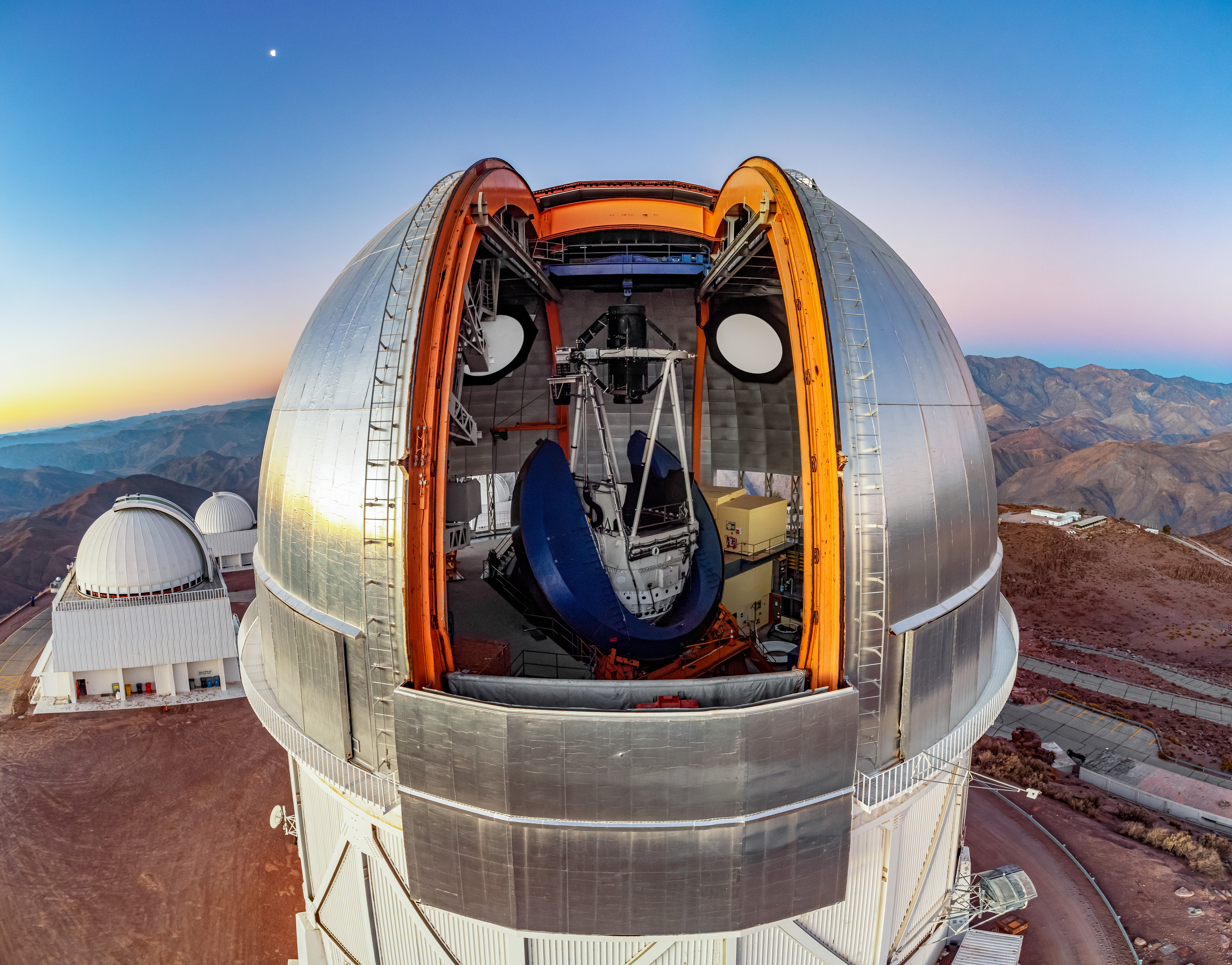
The 4.0-meter Víctor M. Blanco Telescope at Cerro Tololo Observatory, which houses the Dark Energy Camera (DECam)

Discovery images of Chiminigagua by DECam on 17 March 2013

=== Naming and numbering ===
The object is named after Chiminigagua, (Note: In the Chibcha language, the Ch was apparently pronounced something like an English sh.) a universally good god that represented the only light that existed when it was night time. She is the creator god of the Muisca (Chibcha) people that inhabit the Andes mountains in the central part of Colombia. The naming of this object was announced by the International Astronomical Union's Working Group for Small Body Nomenclature (WGSBN) on 11 August 2025. The name follows the WGSBN's recommended naming theme of mythological creation figures for trans-Neptunian objects, which includes scattered disc objects like Chiminigagua.

Before Chiminigagua was officially named, it was known by its provisional designation 2013 FY_{27}, which indicates the year and half-month of the object's discovery date. The Minor Planet Center gave it the permanent catalog number (532037) on 18 May 2019.

== Orbit ==
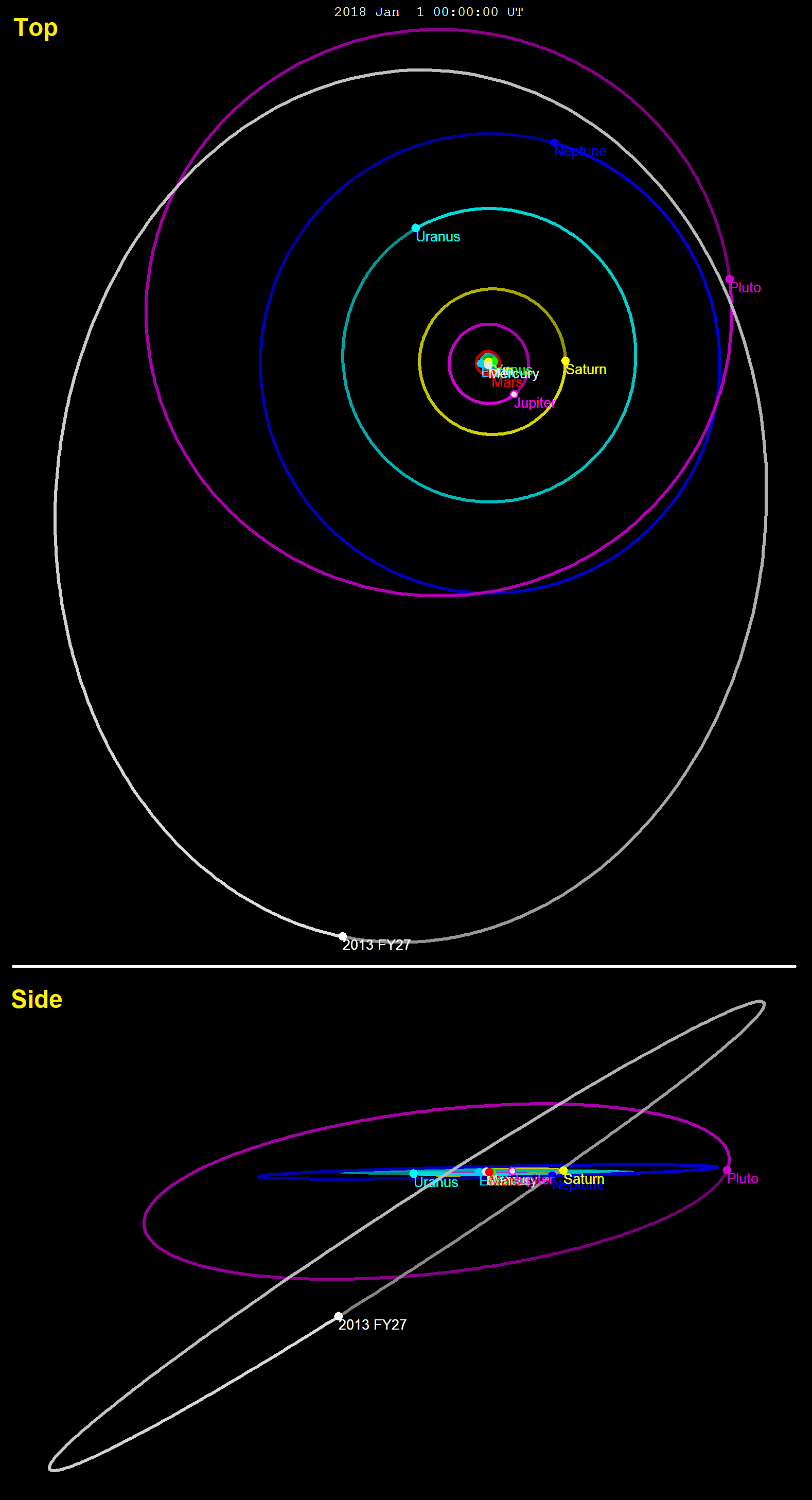
Orbit of Chiminigagua (2013 FY_{27}; colored white) around the Sun, with the orbits of Pluto (magenta) and the other planets shown

Chiminigagua is a trans-Neptunian object (TNO) orbiting the Sun at a semi-major axis or average distance of 58.9 astronomical units (AU). (Note: These orbital elements are expressed in terms of the Solar System Barycenter (SSB) as the frame of reference. Due to planetary perturbations, the Sun revolves around the SSB at non-negligible distances, so heliocentric-frame orbital elements and distances can vary in short timescales as shown in JPL-Horizons.) It follows a highly tilted and elliptical orbit with an eccentricity of 0.39 and inclination of 33.1° with respect to the ecliptic. During its 450-year orbital period, Chiminigagua comes within 35.6 AU from the Sun at perihelion and up to 82.0 AU at aphelion. This large variation in distance from the Sun means Chiminigagua experiences large variations in surface temperature over the course of its orbit: at perihelion Chiminigagua would be 22 K (−251.2 °C; −420.1 °F), whereas at aphelion it would be 16 K (−257.1 °C; −430.9 °F).

Chiminigagua belongs to the scattered disc, which is a population of TNOs that have distant, inclined, and eccentric orbits that come close to Neptune at perihelion. The scattered disc population, which includes the dwarf planets Eris and Gonggong, are strongly influenced by Neptune's gravitational perturbations and consequently experience gravitational scattering.

Chiminigagua passed aphelion in March–April 1978 and is now moving closer to the Sun until it will reach perihelion between October and November 2202. (Note: The uncertainty in Chiminigagua's time of perihelion passage is approximately 10.2 days (1-sigma) or 30.6 days (3-sigma; three times the 1-sigma uncertainty).) Chiminigagua previously passed perihelion in April–May 1752. Chiminigagua was 80.5 AU away from the Sun when it was discovered, and it has since moved a few AU closer. There are over 20 known TNOs that are located farther away from the Sun than Chiminigagua as of 2025.

== Physical characteristics ==
=== Size ===
Chiminigagua has a diameter of about 742 km (461 mi) (full range 660 to 820 km or 410 to 510 mi when including uncertainties), according to Atacama Large Millimeter Array measurements of its thermal emission. Chiminigagua has an absolute magnitude of 3.15±0.03 in visible light, which makes it the ninth- or tenth- intrinsically brightest TNO known as of 2026, depending on the absolute magnitude value used for 2026 ED138. Chiminigagua is large and bright enough that some astronomers and planetary scientists, including Scott Sheppard, Emily Lakdawalla, and Michael E. Brown, have called it a likely dwarf planet.

Among TNO researchers, Chiminigagua is better known as belonging to the proposed class of "mid-sized" TNOs between 400 and 1,000 km (250 and 620 mi) in diameter, which are believed to represent the transition between small, low-density TNOs and large, high-density dwarf planets. In a 2019 study, William M. Grundy and his team have hypothesized that mid-sized TNOs should have highly porous and unheated interiors, because TNOs in this size range (namely 55637 Uni and 229762 Gǃkúnǁʼhòmdímà) have been found to have low densities around 1 g/cm^{3}. The mass and density of Chiminigagua is unknown, however, because the orbit of its moon has not been determined yet. The Hubble Space Telescope has observed Chiminigagua in December 2025 and January 2026, the data of the observations will be able to determine Chiminigagua's mass and density, which will verify the aforementioned hypothesis on the interiors of mid-sized TNOs, though results were not published yet as of November 2026.

=== Surface ===
Comparison of sizes, albedos, and colors of various large trans-Neptunian objects with diameters greater than 700 km (430 mi). Chiminigagua is shown on the bottom row, in the center. The light and dark colored arcs represent uncertainties of the object's size.

Observations of Chiminigagua in different light filters show that it has a moderately red color, which is common among mid-sized TNOs. The moderately red color of Chiminigagua suggests it has an old, ice-poor surface that has been dulled by cosmic rays and micrometeoroid bombardment, in contrast to the fresh, icy surfaces of larger dwarf planets like Pluto. Chiminigagua's brightness and diameter indicates it has a moderate geometric albedo of 0.170+0.045
−0.030, which is on the high end for mid-sized TNOs with moderately red colors.

=== Rotation ===
The rotation period of Chiminigagua is unknown. Observations of Chiminigagua's brightness over time in March and May 2016 showed no obvious variability beyond 0.06±0.02 magnitudes over hours and days. The lack of brightness variation suggests that Chiminigagua has either a very long rotation period, an approximately spheroidal shape with no significant albedo variation, or a rotation axis pointing towards Earth.

== Satellite ==
moon of Chiminigagua
- Timelapse animation of Chiminigagua's moon (yellow arrow) orbiting back and forth, as seen by the Hubble Space Telescope from January to July 2018

Discovery
- Discovered by: Scott S. Sheppard
- Discovery site: Hubble Space Telescope
- Discovery date: 15 January 2018

Orbital characteristics
- Semi-major axis: >9800±40 km
- Orbital period (sidereal): ≈19 d (for assumed density of 1.6 g/cm^{3})
- Satellite of: 532037 Chiminigagua

Physical characteristics
- Mean diameter: 186+25 −26 km (assuming same albedo as Chiminigagua)
- Albedo: 0.170+0.045 −0.030 (assumed)
- Apparent magnitude: 25.5
- Absolute magnitude (H): 6.15 (Note: Given the primary's absolute magnitude of H = 3.15 and a magnitude difference of Δm = 3.00 between the primary and moon, the sum of those magnitudes is the moon's absolute magnitude, 6.15.)

Chiminigagua has one known moon. As of 2026, it has no official designation or name.

=== Discovery ===
The moon was discovered by Scott Sheppard using the Hubble Space Telescope's Wide Field Camera 3 on 15 January 2018, whose high-resolution images revealed it as a faint dot next to Chiminigagua.

Sheppard reported the moon to the International Astronomical Union, which announced the discovery on 10 August 2018 through the Central Bureau for Astronomical Telegrams.

=== Observations and orbit ===
Although Chiminigagua's moon has been observed multiple times by the Hubble Space Telescope from January to July 2018, the details of its orbit are unknown.

These Hubble observations from 2018 showed that the moon orbits relatively close to Chiminigagua, at least 9,800 km (6,100 mi) away (0.17 arcseconds in angular separation) but no farther than 0.25 arcseconds.

The orbit of Chiminigagua's moon is oriented edge-on from Earth's perspective, which means that the moon can pass in front of or behind Chiminigagua and thus evade detection.

The Hubble Space Telescope observed Chiminigagua and its moon in December 2025 and January 2026, with the goal of determining the moon's orbit.

=== Physical characteristics ===
==== Size ====
The moon is 3.0±0.2 magnitudes fainter than Chiminigagua, which suggests it has a diameter between 160 and 211 km (99 and 131 mi) (or about 1/4 of Chiminigagua's diameter) under the assumption that the moon's albedo is the same as Chiminigagua's.

==== Origin ====
Compared to other mid-sized TNOs with moons, the secondary is rather small compared to the primary of the Chiminigagua system.

The relatively small size and close orbit of the moon suggests it formed from an impact on Chiminigagua, similar to the small moons of the larger dwarf planets.

== Exploration concepts ==
A study in 2018 looked at how spaceships could fly to 45 Kuiper belt objects and Pluto. The study was for flights launching between 2025 and 2040. It included space objects that have an absolute magnitude of less than 4.0, including Chiminigagua itself. The paths for these flights are based on the New Horizons mission, which used a fast launch and a gravity assist from Jupiter. If a spaceship flies past Jupiter for a gravity assist, it can reach all 45 KBOs and Pluto in 25 years or less. A more limited number can be reached when non-Jupiter flybys are added, and the KBOs that can be reached via these alternate routes are listed. In most cases, a single Jupiter flyby is the most effcient way to get to the Kuiper belt, but the science return from revisiting Saturn, Uranus, or Neptune may add substantial value to a mission, and so alternate flybys are considered.

== See also ==
- List of possible dwarf planets
- List of Solar System objects by size
