= Trepidation =

Hypothetical oscillation in the precession of the equinoxes

Trepidation (from Lat. trepidus, "trepidatious"), in now-obsolete medieval theories of astronomy, refers to hypothetical oscillation in the precession of the equinoxes. The theory was popular from the 9th to the 16th centuries.

The origin of the theory of trepidation comes from the Small Commentary to the Handy Tables written by Theon of Alexandria in the 4th century CE. In precession, the equinoxes appear to move slowly through the ecliptic, completing a revolution in approximately 25,800 years (according to modern astronomers). Theon states that certain (unnamed) ancient astrologers believed that the precession, rather than being a steady unending motion, instead reverses direction every 640 years. The equinoxes, in this theory, move through the ecliptic at the rate of 1 degree in 80 years over a span of 8 degrees, after which they suddenly reverse direction and travel back over the same 8 degrees. Theon describes but does not endorse this theory.

A more sophisticated version of this theory was adopted in the 9th century to explain a variation which Islamic astronomers incorrectly believed was affecting the rate of precession. This version of trepidation is described in De motu octavae sphaerae (On the Motion of the Eighth Sphere), a Latin translation of a lost Arabic original. The book is attributed to the Arab astronomer Thābit ibn Qurra, but this model has also been attributed to Ibn al-Adami and to Thabit's grandson, Ibrahim ibn Sinan. In this trepidation model, the oscillation is added to the equinoxes as they precess. The oscillation occurred over a period of 7000 years, added to the eighth (or ninth) sphere of the Ptolemaic system. "Thabit's" trepidation model was used in the Alfonsine Tables, which assigned a period of 49,000 years to precession. This version of trepidation dominated Latin astronomy in the later Middle Ages.

Islamic astronomers described other models of trepidation. In the West, an alternative to De motu octavae sphaerae was part of the theory of the motion of the Earth published by Nicolaus Copernicus in De revolutionibus orbium coelestium (1543). Copernicus' version of trepidation combined the oscillation of the equinoxes (now known to be a spurious motion) with a change in the obliquity of the ecliptic (axial tilt), acknowledged today as an authentic motion of the Earth's axis.

Trepidation was a feature of Hindu astronomy and was used to compute ayanamsha for converting sidereal to tropical longitudes. The third chapter of the Suryasiddhanta, verses 9-10, provides the method for computing it, which E. Burgess interprets as 27 degree trepidation in either direction over a full period of 7200 years, at an annual rate of 54 seconds. This is nearly the same as the Arab period of about 7000 years. The zero date according to the Suryasiddhanta was 499 AD, after which trepidation is forward in the same direction as modern equinoctial precession. For the period before 1301 BCE, Suryasiddhantic trepidation would be opposite in sign to equinoctial precession. For the period 1301 BCE to 2299 AD, equinoctial precession and Suryasiddhantic precession would have the same direction and sign, only differing in magnitude. Brahma Siddhanta, Soma Siddhanta and Narada Purana describe exactly the same theory and magnitude of trepidation as in Suryasiddhanta, and some other Puranas also provide concise references to precession, esp Vayu purana and Matsya Purana.
