= List of astrometric solvers =

Programs capable of Astrometric solving:

Engine	Front-end/ installer	License	External access	Blind solving 360° (off line)	Cloud access to nova.astrometry.net	MS-Windows (X86)	Linux (X86)	Linux (ARM)	MacOS	Android
Astrometry.net		GPL3+	command-line nova.astrometry.net	✓	✓	✓(in Windows subsystem Linux)	✓	✓	✓	-
,,	All sky solver (inc Astrometry.net installer)	GPL3+	COM interface	✓	-	✓(Linux emulator Cygwin)	-	-	-	-
,,	ANSVR (inc Astrometry.net installer)	GPL3+	API interface	✓	-	✓(Linux emulator Cygwin)	-	-	-	-
,,	Astrometry.net API lite (inc. installer)	GPL3+	API interface	✓	-	✓(Windows subsystem Linux)	✓	-	-	-
,,	Astrotortilla (inc. Astrometry.net installer)	GPL3+	-	✓	-	✓(Linux emulator Cygwin)	-	-	-	-
,,	Cloudmakers (inc. Astrometry.net installer)	GPL3+	?	✓	-	-	-	-	✓	-
,,	StellarSolver	GPL3+	-	✓	-	✓	✓	✓	✓	-
ASTAP		MPL 2.0	command-line	✓	-	✓	✓	✓	✓	✓
Astrometrica		Proprietary	-	-	-	✓	-	-	-	-
Image Link	TheSkyX	Proprietary	-	✓	-	✓	✓	-	✓	-
Observatory		Proprietary	-	-	✓	-	-	-	✓	-
PinPoint		Proprietary	DLL	✓using external programs ANSVR & Astrometry.net	✓	✓	-	-	-	-
PixInsight		Proprietary	-	-	-	✓	✓	-	✓	-
PlateSolve2		Free to use	command-line	-	-	✓	-	-	-	-
PlateSolve3	PlaneWave Interface	Proprietary	command-line	✓	-	✓	-	-	-	-
PRISM Pro		Proprietary	-	✓	✓	✓	-	-	-	-
Regim		Free to use	-	-	-	✓	✓	?	✓	-
SIPS		Free to use	-	-	-	✓	-	-	-	-
Siril		GPL3+	-	-	-	✓	✓	✓	✓	-
Tetra3		MPL 2.0	Python3 class	-	-	✓	✓	✓	✓	-
XParallax viu		Free software, CC BY-NC-ND 4.0	-	-	-	✓	-	-	-	-
