= Timocharis =

Ancient Greek astronomer

Timocharis of Alexandria (Ancient Greek: Τιμόχαρις; c. 320–260 BC), also called Timochares (Τιμοχάρης), was a Greek astronomer and philosopher. Likely born in Alexandria, he was a contemporary of Euclid.

== Work ==
What little is known about Timocharis comes from citations by Ptolemy in the Almagest. These indicate that Timocharis worked in Alexandria during the 290s and 280s BC. Ptolemy lists the declination of 18 stars as recorded by Timocharis or Aristillus in roughly the year 290 BC. Between 295 and 272 BC, Timocharis recorded four lunar occultations and the passage of the planet Venus across a star. These were recorded using both the Egyptian and Athenian calendars. The observed stellar passage by Venus may have occurred on October 12, 272 BC, when the planet came within 15 arcminutes of the star η Virginis.

The observations by Timocharis are among the oldest Greek records that can be assigned a specific date. They are only exceeded by records of the summer solstice of 432 BC, as noted by Euctemon and Meton. Timocharis worked with Aristillus in an astronomical observatory that was most likely part of the Library of Alexandria. Their equipment would have been simple, most likely consisting of gnomons, sundials, and an armillary sphere. The two were contemporaries of Aristarchus of Samos, but it is unclear whether there was any association between Timocharis and Aristarchus.

During his astronomical observations, Timocharis recorded that the star Spica was located 8° west of the Autumnal equinox. Later, Hipparchus observed that Spica was only 6° west of the Autumnal equinox. Hipparchus was able to deduce the period during which Timocharis made his observations based upon the records of earlier lunar eclipses. From this difference, Hipparchus discovered that the longitudes of the stars had changed over time, which led him to determine the first value of the precession of the equinoxes as no less than 1/100° per year.

In approximately the 3rd century BC, with the help of Aristillus, he created the first star catalogue in the Western world.

The crater Timocharis on the Moon is named after him.

== Influence ==
Galileo assigns to Arsatilis and Timocharis the origin "third opinion" on the number of heavens, namely that there were nine heavens, seven for the planets, one for the daily movement of the firmament from east to west, and another for the slower motion from west to east, while crediting Hipparchus, Agrias, Milaeus and Ptolemy with improving the model. This was when Galileo was of the opinion that there were ten movable heavens, and an eleventh immovable.
