= Aristyllus =

Greek astronomer

Aristyllus (Greek: Ἀρίστυλλος; fl. c. 261 BC) was a Greek astronomer, presumably of the school of Timocharis (c. 300 BC). He was among the earliest meridian-astronomy observers. Six of his stellar declinations are preserved in the Almagest (7.3). All are exactly correct within his over-cautious rounding to 1/4 degree. See discussion (and lessons) at DIO 7.1 ‡1 p. 13 (2007).

Aristyllus was long mis-dated to c. 300 BC (which made his data look among the poorest of the ancients); but when his correct date was found by least-squares (Isis 73:259-265 [1982] p. 263), it was realized that his star declinations' accuracy was unexcelled in antiquity. His data suggest that he worked in Alexandria: see DIO 4.1 ‡3 Table 3 p. 45 (2004).

A lunar crater, Aristillus, aptly near the Moon's meridian and at a lunar latitude roughly equal to the terrestrial latitude of Alexandria, is named after him.

== Sources ==
- Thomas Hockey's Biographical Encyclopedia of Astronomers provides the following information about him:

"Aristyllus was an early astronomer in the school of Alexandria. Little is known about him. He made astronomical observations during the first half of the third century BCE, and was probably a pupil of Timocharis."

"Aristyllus and Timocharis are usually considered to have compiled the first true catalog of the fixed stars, in which stars are identified by numerical measurements of their positions."

- William Smith's Dictionary of Greek and Roman Biography and Mythology provides the following information about him:

"Aristyllus, a Greek astronomer, who appears to have lived about B.C. 233. He wrote a work on the fixed stars (τηρήσις ἀπλανῶν), which was used by Hipparchus and Ptolemy, and he is undoubtedly one of the two persons of this name who wrote commentaries on Aratus."
