= Jacob ben Machir ibn Tibbon =

Jewish astronomer

Jacob ben Machir ibn Tibbon (Hebrew: יעקב בן מכיר ׳ן תיבון; c. 1236 – c. 1304), also known as Prophatius, was a Jewish astronomer. He was a member of the Ibn Tibbon family.

== Biography ==
He was probably born in Marseille in c. 1236 and died in Montpellier in c. 1304. He was a grandson of Samuel ben Judah ibn Tibbon. His Provençal name was Don Profiat Tibbon; the Latin writers called him Profatius Judæus. Jacob occupies a considerable place in the history of astronomy in the Middle Ages. His works, translated into Latin, were quoted by Copernicus, Reinhold, and Clavius. He was also highly reputed as a physician, and, according to Jean Astruc ("Mémoires pour Servir à l'Histoire de la Faculté de Médecine de Montpellier," p. 168), Ibn Tibbon was regent of the faculty of medicine of Montpellier.

In the controversy between the Maimonists and the anti-Maimonists, Jacob defended science against the attacks of Abba Mari and his party; the energetic attitude of the community of Montpellier on that occasion was due to his influence.

Ibn Tibbon argued that translating Euclid was restoring wisdom lost to Jews from the exile.

== Works ==
Jacob became known by a series of Hebrew translations of Arabic scientific and philosophical works, and above all by two original works on astronomy. His translations are:

- the Elements of Euclid, divided into fifteen chapters
- the treatise of Qusta ibn Luqa on the armillary sphere, in sixty-five chapters
- Sefer ha-Mattanot, the Data of Euclid
- Autolycus' On the Moving Sphere
- Theodosius' Spherics
- Menelaus' Spherics
- Ma'amar bi-Tekunah, or Sefer 'al Tekunah, in forty-four chapters
- a treatise on the use of the astrolabe
- compendium of the Almagest of Ptolemy
- Iggeret ha-Ma'aseh be-Luaḥ ha-Niḳra Sofiḥah
- preface to Abraham bar Ḥiyya's astronomical work
- an extract from the Almagest on the arc of a circle
- "Ḳiẓẓur mi-Kol Meleket Higgayon," Averroes' compendium of the Organon (Riva di Trento, 1559)
- Averroes' paraphrase of books xi–xix of Aristotle's history of animals
- Mozene ha-'Iyyunim, falsely attributed to Ghazali, including also a large part deriving from the Encyclopedia of the Brethren of Purity (Rasā’il Ikhwān al-Ṣafā’)

The two original works of Jacob are:

- a description of the astronomical instrument called the quadrant (Bibliothèque Nationale, Paris, MS. No. 1054), in sixteen chapters, the last of which shows how to construct this instrument. This was translated several times into Latin (once by Armengaud Blaise)
- astronomical tables, beginning with 1 March 1300 (Munich MS. No. 343, 26). These tables were translated into Latin and enjoyed great repute.

== See also ==
- Hachmei Provence
- Jacob's staff
