= Little Astronomy =

Collection of minor Ancient Greek astronomical works

Little Astronomy (Greek: Μικρὸς Ἀστρονομούμενος Mikrós Astronomoúmenos) is a collection of minor works in Ancient Greek mathematics and astronomy dating from the 4th to 2nd century BCE that were probably used as an astronomical curriculum starting around the 2nd century CE. In the astronomy of the medieval Islamic world, with a few additions, the collection became known as the Middle Books (Arabic: كتاب المتوسطات Kitāb al-mutawassiṭāt), mathematical preparation for Claudius Ptolemy's Almagest, intended for students who had already studied Euclid's Elements.

== Works in the collection ==
The works contained in the collection are:

- Spherics by Theodosius of Bithynia: On spherical geometry, in the style of the Elements.
- On the Moving Sphere by Autolycus of Pitane: On the movements of points and arcs on a sphere as it rotates on its axis.
- Optics by Euclid: On various effects involving propagation of light, including shadows, parallax, and perspective.
- Phaenomena by Euclid: A treatise in 18 propositions, each dealing with important arcs on the celestial sphere.
- On Habitations by Theodosius: Description of the appearance of the sky as seen from different places on earth.
- On Days and Nights by Theodosius: A treatise in 31 propositions on the lengths of days and nights at different times of the year.
- On the Sizes and Distances by Aristarchus of Samos: On the size of the Sun and Moon in the sky.
- On Risings and Settings by Autolycus: On the relationship between the rising and setting of stars throughout the year.
- On Ascensions by Hypsicles: A treatise on arithmetic progressions used to calculate approximate times for the signs of the Zodiac to rise above the horizon.

In Arabic translation as the Middle Books, additional works, also originally written in Ancient Greek, were often included:

- Spherics by Menelaus of Alexandria: A treatise on the geometry of spherical triangles, which only survives in Arabic translation
- Data by Euclid
- Various works by or attributed to Archimedes: On the Sphere and Cylinder, On the Measurement of the Circle, Book of Lemmas

Although these works are all generally found together in numerous medieval Byzantine and Arabic manuscripts, it is unclear whether this specific set of works was originally intentionally compiled together as a collection. All of the works are elementary treatises that would have been useful in a classroom setting, which increased their chance of survival through continuous use by students, and may have resulted in several of them being gathered together multiple different times independently. The earliest known author to mention the existence of a discrete "Little Astronomy" collection by name is Pappus of Alexandria, in the 4th century CE, who devotes book VI of his Collection to a commentary on selected works by Theodosius, Menelaus, Aristarchus, Euclid, and Autolycus. The oldest manuscript in which all of the extant Greek works are preserved together is Codex Vaticanus Graecus 204, which dates from the 9th or 10th century CE.
