= Spherics =

Spherics (sometimes spelled sphaerics or sphaerica) is a term used in the history of mathematics for historical works on spherical geometry, exemplified by the Spherics (Ancient Greek: τὰ σφαιρικά tá sphairiká), a treatise by the Hellenistic mathematician Theodosius (2nd or early 1st century BC), and another treatise of the same title by Menelaus of Alexandria (c. 100 AD).
