= Pappus's theorem =

Pappus's theorem may refer to:

- Pappus's area theorem
- Pappus's centroid theorem
- Pappus's hexagon theorem
