= Theodosius' Spherics =

Ancient Greek spherical geometry treatise

The Spherics (Greek: τὰ σφαιρικά, tà sphairiká) is a three-volume treatise on spherical geometry written by the Hellenistic mathematician Theodosius of Bithynia in the 2nd or 1st century BC.

Book I and the first half of Book II establish basic geometric constructions needed for spherical geometry using the tools of Euclidean solid geometry, while the second half of Book II and Book III contain propositions relevant to astronomy as modeled by the celestial sphere.

Primarily consisting of theorems which were known at least informally a couple centuries earlier, the Spherics was a foundational treatise for geometers and astronomers from its origin until the 19th century. It was continuously studied and copied in Greek manuscript for more than a millennium. It was translated into Arabic in the 9th century during the Islamic Golden Age, and thence translated into Latin in 12th century Iberia, though the text and diagrams were somewhat corrupted. In the 16th century printed editions in Greek were published along with better translations into Latin.

== History ==
Several of the definitions and theorems in the Spherics were used without mention in Euclid's Phenomena and two extant works by Autolycus concerning motions of the celestial sphere, all written about two centuries before Theodosius. It has been speculated that this tradition of Greek "spherics" – founded in the axiomatic system and using the methods of proof of solid geometry exemplified by Euclid's Elements but extended with additional definitions relevant to the sphere – may have originated in a now-unknown work by Eudoxus, who probably established a two-sphere model of the cosmos (spherical Earth and celestial sphere) sometime between 370–340 BC.

The Spherics is a supplement to the Elements, and takes its content for granted as a prerequisite. The Spherics follows the general presentation style of the Elements, with definitions followed by a list of theorems (propositions), each of which is first stated abstractly as prose, then restated with points lettered for the proof. It analyses spherical circles as flat circles lying in planes intersecting the sphere and provides geometric constructions for various configurations of spherical circles. Spherical distances and radii are treated as Euclidean distances in the surrounding 3-dimensional space. The relationship between planes is described in terms of dihedral angle. As in the Elements, there is no concept of angle measure or trigonometry per se.

This approach differs from other quantitative methods of Greek astronomy such as the analemma (orthographic projection), stereographic projection, or trigonometry (a fledgling subject introduced by Theodosius' contemporary Hipparchus). It also differs from the approach taken in Menelaus' Spherics, a treatise of the same title written 3 centuries later, which treats the geometry of the sphere intrinsically, analyzing the inherent structure of the spherical surface and circles drawn on it rather than primarily treating it as a surface embedded in three-dimensional space.

In late antiquity, the Spherics was part of a collection of treatises now called the Little Astronomy, an assortment of shorter works on geometry and astronomy building on Euclid's Elements. Other works in the collection included Aristarchus' On the Sizes and Distances, Autolycus' On Rising and Settings and On the Moving Sphere, Euclid's Catoptrics, Data, Optics, and Phenomena, Hypsicles' On Ascensions, Theodosius' On Geographic Places and On Days and Nights, and Menelaus' Spherics. Often several of these were bound together in a single volume. During the Islamic Golden Age, the books in the collection were translated into Arabic, and with the addition of a few new works, were known as the Middle Books, intended to fit between the Elements and Ptolemy's Almagest.

Authoritative critical editions of the Greek text, compiled from several manuscripts, were made by Heiberg (1927) and Czinczenheim (2000). Sidoli & Thomas (2023) is an English translation by modern scholars.

== Editions and translations ==
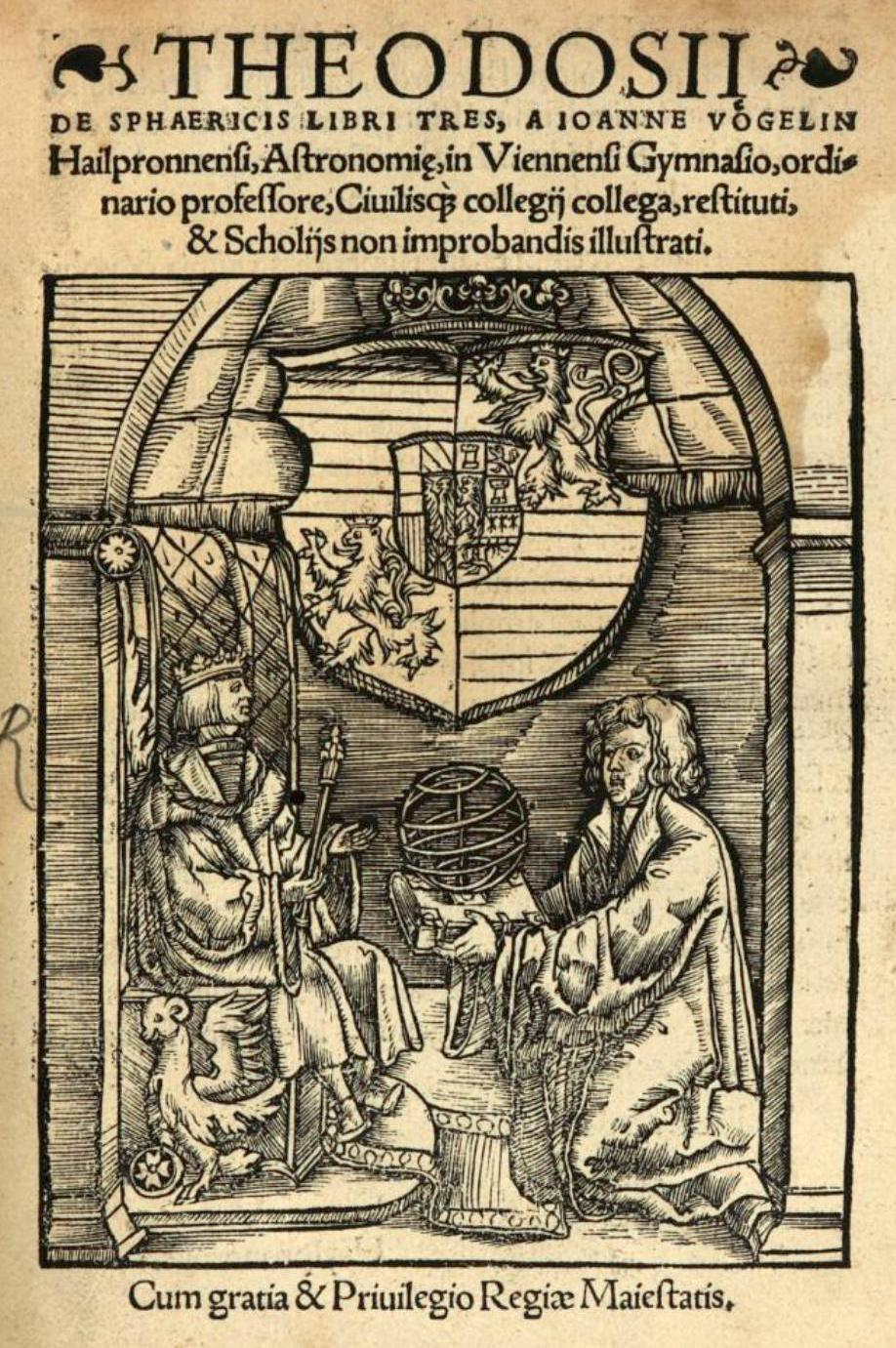
1529 title page: Editor Johannes Vögelin presents his work to the king

- partial edition in: Valla, Giorgio, ed. (1501). "De sphaericis (book XII, chapter V)". De fugiendis et expetendis rebus (in Latin). Vol. 1. Venetiis: Aldus Manutius.
- Sphera mundi noviter recognita cum commentariis et authoribus in hoc volumine contentis, videlicet [...] Theodosii de Spheris [...] (in Latin). Venetiis. 1518.
- Vögelin, Johannes, ed. (1529). Theodosii de Sphaericis libri tres (in Latin). Vienna: Joannes Singrenius.
- Maurolico, Francesco, ed. (1558). Theodosii sphaericorum elementorum libri III, ex traditione Maurolyci Messanensis mathematici (in Latin). Messina: Petrus Spira mense Augusto.
- Péna, Jean, ed. (1558). Theodosij Tripolitae Sphaericorum, libri tres (in Greek and Latin). Paris: Andreas Wechelus.
- Dasypodius, Conrad, ed. (1573). Sphaericae doctrinae propositiones (in Latin and Greek). Argentorati: Excudebat Christianus Mylius.
- Clavius, Christopher, ed. (1586). Theodosii Tripolitae Sphaericorum Libri III (in Latin). Rome: Ex Typographia Dominici Basae.
- Henrion, Denis, ed. (1615). Les trois livres des Élémens spériques de Théodose Tripolitain (in French). Paris: Chez Abraham Pacard.
- Hérigone, Pierre, ed. (1637). "Theodosii Sphaerica = Sphériques de Théodose". Cursus mathematicus = Cours mathématique (in Latin and French). Vol. 5. Parisiis: Henry le Gras. pp. 218–329.
- Barrow, Isaac, ed. (1675). Theodosii Sphaerica: Methodo Nova Illustrata, & Succinctè Demonstrata (in Latin). London: Guil. Godbid.
- Hunt, Joseph, ed. (1707). Theodosiou Sphairikōn biblia 3. Theodosii Sphaericorum libri tres (in Greek and Latin). Oxford: H. Clements.
- Stone, Edmund, ed. (1721). Clavius's Commentary on the Sphericks of Theodosius Tripolitae: or, Spherical Elements. London: J. Senex.
- Nizze, Ernst, ed. (1826). Die Sphärik des Theodosios (in German). Stralsund.
- Nizze, Ernst, ed. (1852). Theodosii Tripolitae Sphaericorum Libros Tres (in Greek and Latin). Berlin: Georgii Reimer.
- Heiberg, Johan Ludvig, ed. (1927). Theodosius. Sphaerica (in Greek and Latin). Berlin: Weidmannsche Buchhandlung.
- Ver Eecke, Paul, ed. (1927). Les sphériques de Théodose de Tripoli (in French). Bruges: Brouwer et Cie.
- Czwalina, Arthur, ed. (1931). Autolykos: Rotierende kugel und Aufgang und untergang der gestirne. Theodosios von Tripolis: Sphaerik. Übersetzt und mit anmerkungen versehen (in German). Leipzig: Akademische verlagsgesellschaft m. b. h.
- Naṣīr al-Dīn al-Ṭūsī, ed. (1939). Kitāb al-ukar li-Thāʾudhūsiyūs: Taḥrīr al-alāma al-faylasūf al-H̱awāǧah Naṣīr al-Dīn Muḥammad ibn Muḥammad ibn al-Ḥasan al-Ṭūsī كتاب الاكر لثاوذوسيوس: تحرير العلامة الفيلسوف الخوا نصير الدين محمد بن محمد بن الحسن الطوصي (in Arabic). Ḥaydarʾābād: Dāʾirat al-maʿārif al-ʿuthmānīyyah.
- Martin, Thomas J., ed. (1975). The Arabic Translation of Theodosius's Sphaerica (PhD thesis) (in Arabic and English). University of St. Andrews.
- Czinczenheim, Claire, ed. (2000). Édition, traduction et commentaire des Sphériques de Théodose (PhD thesis) (in Greek and French). Université de Paris IV, Paris-Sorbonne.
- Spandagos, Vangelēs, ed. (2000). Ta Sphairika tu Theodosiu tu Tripolitu Τα Σφαιρικα του Θεοδοσιου του Τριπολιτου (in Greek). Athens: Aithra. ISBN 9789607007889.
- Kunitzsch, Paul; Lorch, Richard, eds. (2010). Theodosius, "Sphaerica": Arabic and Medieval Latin Translations (in Arabic, Latin, and English). Stuttgart: Franz Steiner. ISBN 9783515092883.
- Sidoli, Nathan; Thomas, Robert Spencer David, eds. (2023). The Spherics of Theodosios. London: Routledge. doi:10.4324/9781003142164. ISBN 9780367557300.
