= Muzio Oddi =

Italian mathematician and Gnomonist

- Born: October 14, 1569; Urbino, Duchy of Urbino
- Died: 15 December 1639 (aged 70); Urbino, Papal States
- Occupations: Mathematician; architect; Gnomonist
- Parent(s): Lattanzio Oddi and Lisabetta Oddi (née Genga)

Academic background
- Influences: Francesco di Giorgio Martini; Girolamo Genga; Federico Commandino; Guidobaldo del Monte

Academic work
- Discipline: Mathematics; Geometry
- Institutions: Palatine School; University of Urbino

Muzio or Mutio Oddi (15 December 1569 – 15 December 1639) was an Italian mathematician and Gnomonist.

== Biography ==
He was born to Lisabetta Genga and Lattanzio Oddi. His initial training was in eloquence and philosophy, but he later trained under the painter Federico Barocci. He moved to Pesaro to work under Guidobaldo del Monte, one of the main disciples of Federico Commandino. He was hired to work in Spain and France as a military engineer, which required him also to help train in the use of artillery. He returned to the Duchy of Urbino to work as an engineer under the Duke Francesco Maria II della Rovere.

In 1601, he was accused, perhaps unfairly, of being involved in a plot that also involved the Marchese Ippolito della Rovere; the plot aimed to depose the Duke Francesco Maria. In 1609, Muzio Oddi was released from prison, and exiled to Milan.

In Milan, he won a competition to become professor of mathematics. He published his works, prepared in prison, including De gli horologi solari nelle superficie piane (1614, dedicated to Count and Cardinal Teodoro Trivulzio, probably one of his patrons), and a treatise entitled Dello squadro (1625) regarding surveyor's quadrants.

In 1625, Oddi replaced his brother, Matteo, as chief fortifications engineer to the Republic of Lucca. In 1626, he helped design new city walls and was rewarded with a commemorative medal. In 1631, he became architect for the Sanctuary of the Holy House of Loreto, and in 1633 publishes his book on the proportional or military compass, In 1636, he moves to Lucca to work as a military engineer. Late in life, he returned to Urbino as a professor of mathematics. In 1638, he publishes a second book on sundials, De gli horologi solari, also composed while in prison. He was reappointed Gonfaloniere in Urbino. A few letters to Christopher Clavius and others exist.

== Works ==
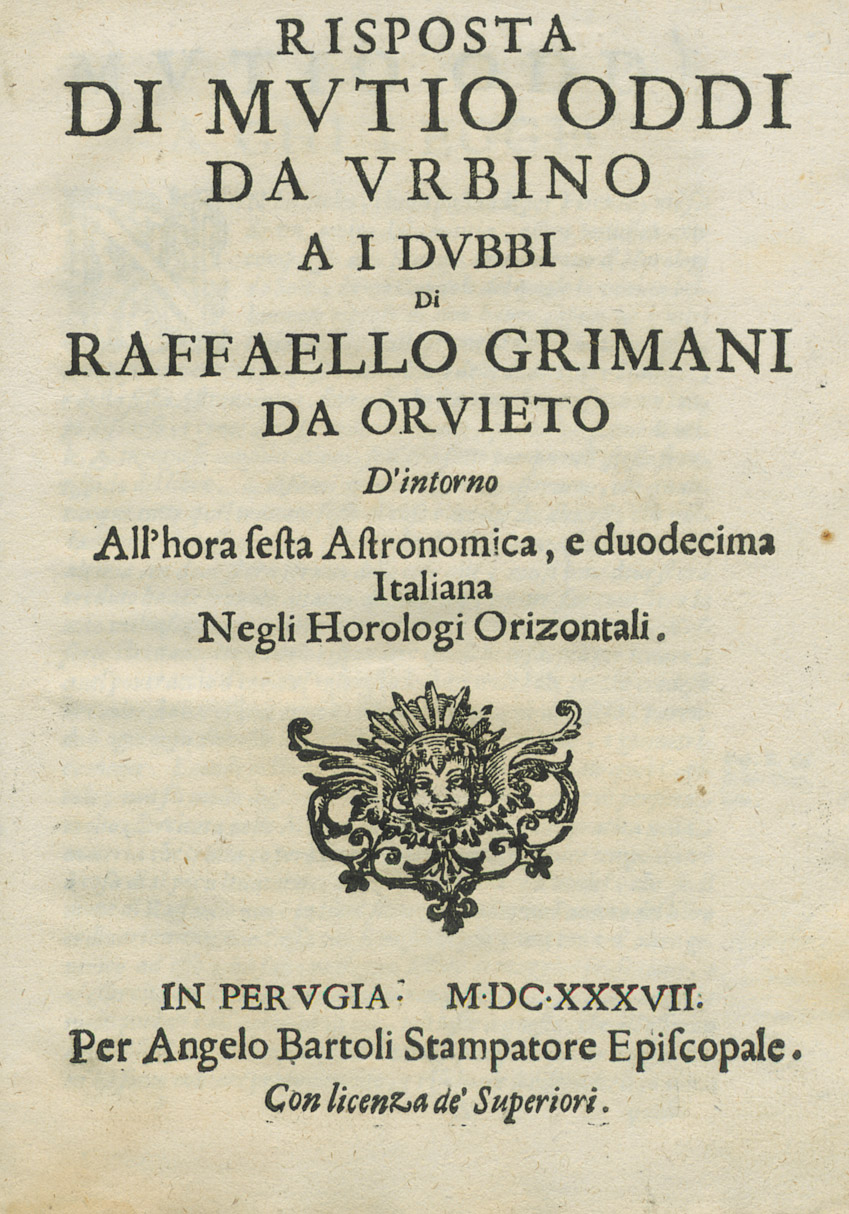
Risposta d'intorno all'hora sesta astronomica e duodecima italiana negli horologi orizontali, 1637

- Muzio Oddi (1614). De gli horologi solari nelle superficie piane. Per Giacomo Lantoni.
- Muzio Oddi (September 2010) [1625]. Dello Squadro Trattato. Kessinger Publishing. ISBN 978-1-165-33780-4.
- Muzio Oddi (1633). Fabrica et vso del compasso polimetro di Mutio Oddi . appresso Francesco Fobella.
- Muzio Oddi (1638). De Gli Horologi Solari: Trattato. Per il Ginammi.
- Muzio Oddi (1637). Risposta a i dubbi di Raffaello Grimani d'intorno all'hora sexta astronomica ...
- Muzio Oddi (1638). De gli horologi solari trattato di Mutio Oddi da Vrbino. per il Ginammi.
- Muzio Oddi; Alexander Marr (2005). I Gheribizzi di Muzio Oddi. Accademia Raffaello. ISBN 978-88-87573-21-3.

== Sources ==
- Oddi Muzio: Gnomonista Coraggioso, Biografia di Nicola Severino
- Degli Uomini Illustri di Urbino Commentario, Urbino, 1819, Carlo Grossi, (Short Biography of Oddi)
- Alexander Marr (2011). Between Raphael and Galileo: Mutio Oddi and the Mathematical Culture of Late Renaissance Italy. University of Chicago Press. ISBN 978-0-226-50628-9.
- This entry was translated from the Italian entry on Oddi Muzzio.Sabine Eiche, I Gheribizzi di Muzio Oddi (Urbino: Accademia Raffaello, 2005).
- Enrico Gamba and Vico Montebelli, Le scienze a Urbino nel tardo Rinascimento (Urbino: Quattroventi, 1988).
- Alexander Marr, 'The Production and Distribution of Mutio Oddi's Dello squadro', in S. Kusukawa and I. Maclean (eds.), Transmitting Knowledge: Words, Images and Instruments Early Modern Europe (Oxford-Warburg, 2006), pp. 165–192.
