= Diodorus of Alexandria =

Diodorus of Alexandria or Diodorus Alexandrinus was a gnomonicist, astronomer and a pupil of Posidonius.

== Writings ==
He wrote the first discourse on the principles of the sundial, known as Analemma. a commentary on this having later been written by Pappus of Alexandria, that is no longer extant. A small number of sentences having survived the centuries and attributed to him are known; these comment on: the differences between astronomy and natural science, the word meanings for cosmos and star, the nature of stars and the Milky Way. He was known to Eudoros. A few surviving passages might come from a commentary on Aratus. In his dealings with astronomy he was known to Marinus in his commentary on Euclid's Data containing quotes of Diodorus's opinions on the meaning of a term.

== See also ==
- Alexandria
- Analemma
- Euclid
- History of sundials
