= Francesco Maurolico =

Sicilian mathematician and astronomer (1494–1575)

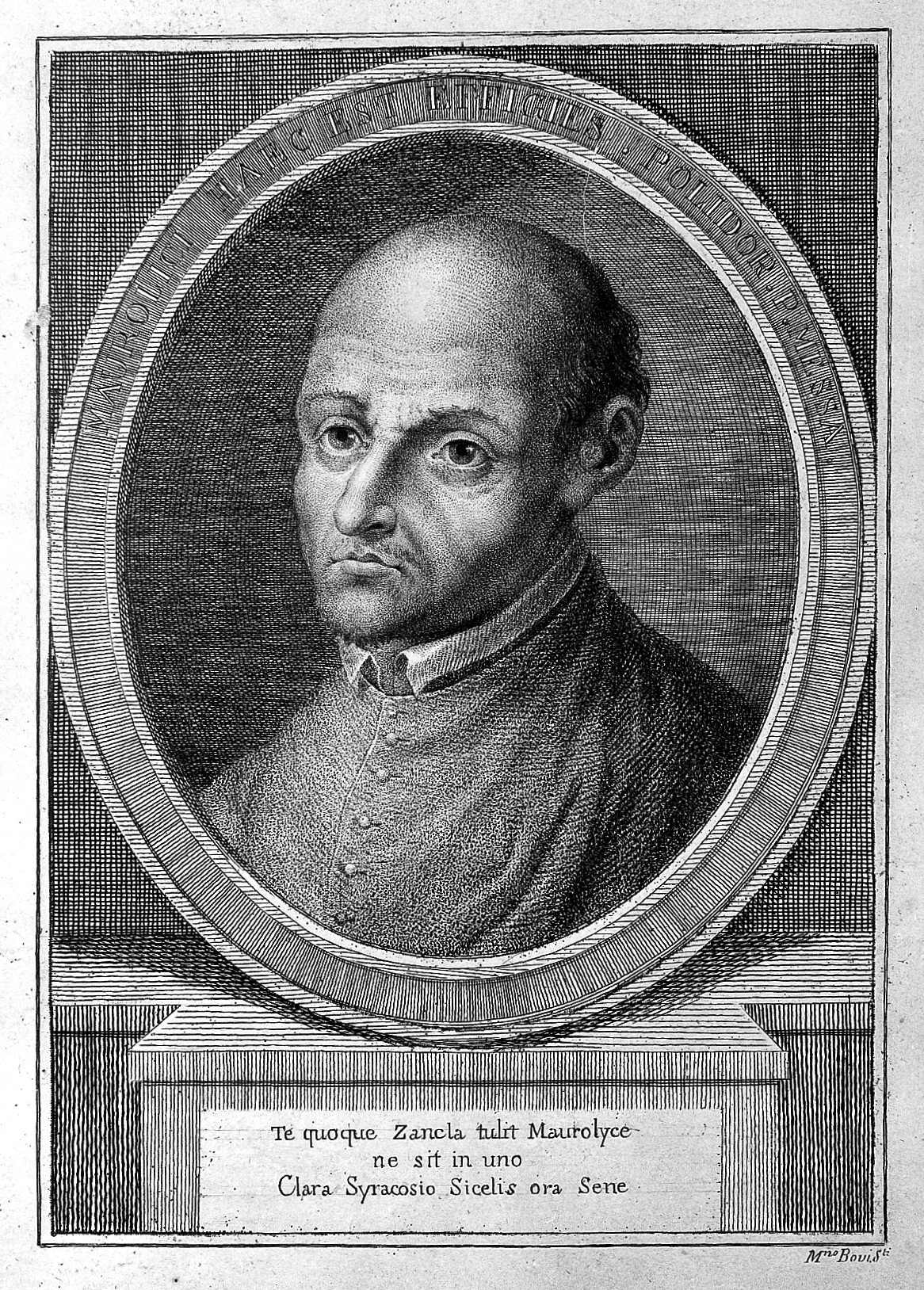
- Engraving of Maurolico
- Born: 16 September 1494; Messina, Kingdom of Sicily
- Died: 22 July 1575 (aged 80); Messina, Kingdom of Sicily
- Scientific career
- Fields: Mathematics, geometry, optics, conics, mechanics, music, astronomy
- Workplaces: University of Messina

Francesco Maurolico (Latin: Franciscus Maurolycus; Italian: Francesco Maurolico; Greek: Φραγκίσκος Μαυρόλυκος; Sicilian: Francescu Maurolicu; 16 September 1494 – 22 July 1575) was an Italian mathematician and astronomer from the Kingdom of Sicily. He made contributions to the fields of geometry, optics, conics, mechanics, music, and astronomy. He edited the works of classical authors including Archimedes, Apollonius, Autolycus, Theodosius and Serenus. He also composed his own unique treatises on mathematics and mathematical science.

== Life ==
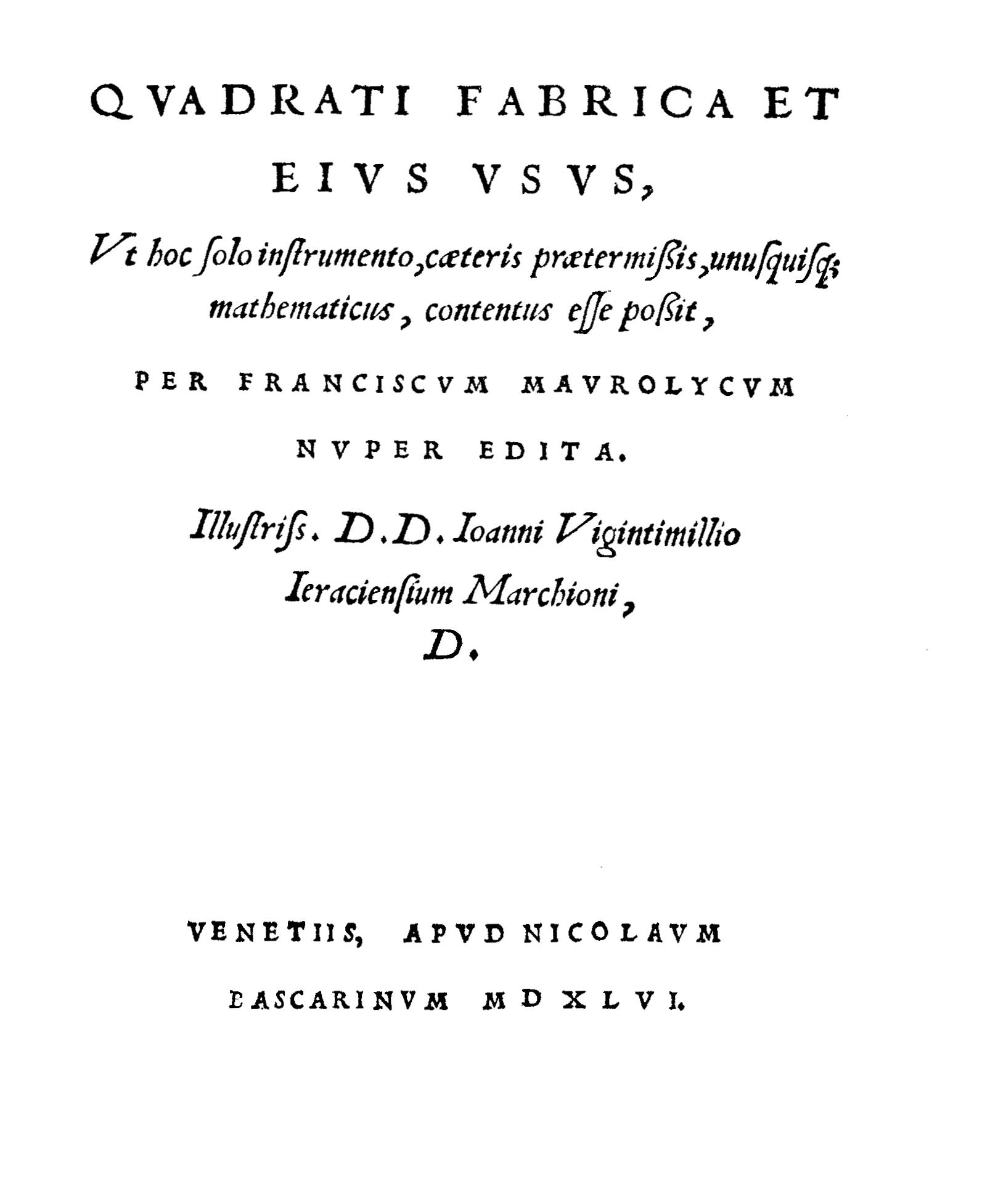
Quadrati fabrica et eius usus, 1546

Francesco was born in Messina with the surname of Marulì, although the surname is sometimes reported as "Mauroli". He was one of seven sons of Antonio Marulì, a government official, and Penuccia. His father was a Greek physician who fled Constantinople when the Ottomans invaded the city. Antonio had studied with the Neoplatonic Hellenist Constantine Lascaris, so Francesco received a "Lascarian" education through his father and from Francesco Faraone and Giacomo Genovese, also disciples of Lascaris, whose influence is recognizable.

In 1534 Francesco Marulì changed his surname to Mauro Lyco (from the meaning of "occult wolf"), after having adopted for eight years, uninterruptedly, the name of Mauro Lycio ("occult Apollo") as a member of a Messina academy.

Having already obtained priestly ordination since 1521 and, consequently, some ecclesiastical benefit, he was appointed abbot of the monastery of Santa Maria del Parto (in Castelbuono) in 1550 by Simone Ventimiglia marquis of Geraci, pupil and patron of Maurolico.

He died in Messina 1575 of natural death, during a plague epidemic due to which the mathematician had retired to Contrada Annunziata: a hilly area north of Messina, where the Marulì family owned a villa that probably had hosted, sometimes, the academy of which the scientist-humanist had been part.

He is buried in the church of San Giovanni di Malta in Messina, where his nephews Francesco and Silvestro Maurolico erected an artistic marble sarcophagus, accompanied by the uncle's bust and Maurolico's coat of arms with the wolf and the star Sirius.

== Work ==
In 1535, Maurolico collaborated with the painter Polidoro da Caravaggio in designing triumphal arches (composing the Latin inscriptions for this apparato) for the entry into the city of Messina by Holy Roman Emperor Charles V. Like his father, he also became head of the Messina mint and for a time was in charge of maintaining the fortifications of the city on behalf of Charles V. Maurolico tutored the two sons of Charles's viceroy in Sicily, Juan de Vega, and had the patronage of many rich and powerful men. He also corresponded with scholars such as Clavius and Federico Commandino. In 1547 he collaborated with the sculptor Giovanni Angelo Montorsoli for the creation of the famous Orion Fountain in Messina. By Maurolico are the Latin inscriptions on the ground-level basin of the fountain and, probably, most of the Neoplatonic program for this monumental civic sculpture. Between 1548 and 1550, he stayed at the castle of Pollina in Sicily as a guest of the marquis Giovanni II Ventimiglia, and utilized the castle tower in order to carry out astronomical observations.

Maurolico's astronomical observations include a sighting of the supernova that appeared in Cassiopeia in 1572. Tycho Brahe published details of his observations in 1574; the supernova is now known as Tycho's Supernova.

In 1569, he was appointed professor at the University of Messina.

== Legacy ==
The lunar crater Maurolycus is named after him.

There is a school in Messina with his name.

In 2009 the Italian Ministry of Cultural Heritage has ordained the establishment of the Edizione nazionale dell'opera matematica di Francesco Maurolico (National Edition of Maurolico's mathematical oeuvre).

== Works ==
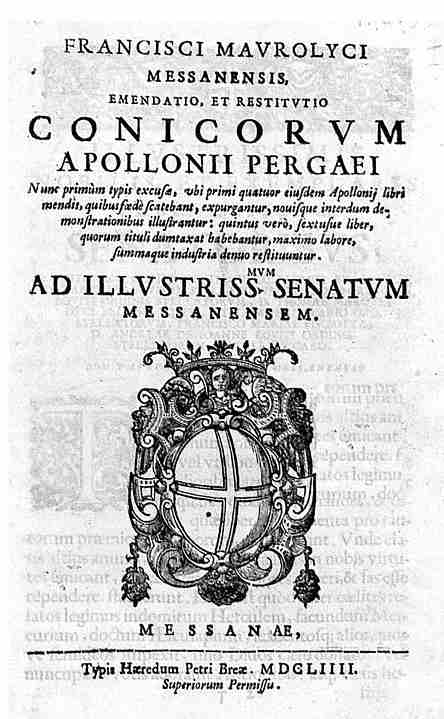
1654 edition of Conica by Apollonius of Perga edited by Francesco Maurolico

- Maurolico's Photismi de lumine et umbra and Diaphana concern the refraction of light and attempted to explain the natural phenomenon of the rainbow. He also studied the camera obscura. Photismi were completed in 1521, Diaphana first part 1523, the second and third ones in 1552, but all the material was published posthumously only in 1611.
- His unpublished manuscript Compaginationes solidorum regularium (1537) includes a statement of Euler's formula $V-E+F=2$ for the Platonic solids, long before Leonhard Euler formulated it more generally for convex polyhedra in 1752.
- His Arithmeticorum libri duo (1575) includes the first known proof by mathematical induction.
- His De momentis aequalibus (completed in 1548, but first published only in 1685) attempted to calculate the center of gravity of various bodies (pyramid, paraboloid, etc.).
- In his Sicanicarum rerum compendium, he presented the history of Sicily, and included some autobiographical details. He had been commissioned to write this work, and in 1553 the Senate of Messina granted him a salary of 100 gold pieces per year for two years so that he could finish this work and his works on mathematics.
- His De Sphaera Liber Unus (1575) contains a fierce attack against Copernicus' heliocentrism, in which Maurolico writes that Copernicus "deserved a whip or a scourge rather than a refutation".
- Maurolico published a Cosmographia in which he described a methodology for measuring the earth, which was later employed by Jean Picard in measuring length of meridian arc in 1670.
- Maurolico published an edition of Aristotle's Mechanics, and a work on music. He summarized Ortelius's Theatrum orbis terrarum and also wrote Grammatica rudimenta (1528) and De lineis horariis. He made a map of Sicily, which was published in 1575.
- Maurolico worked on ancient mathematical texts: Theodosius of Bithynia, Menelaus of Alexandria, Autolycus of Pitane, Euclid, Apollonius of Perga and Archimedes. He did not make new translations, but working on the existing ones, he provided new and sound interpretations of Greek mathematics.

=== Publications ===
- Cosmographia (in Latin). Venezia: eredi Lucantonio Giunta (1.). 1543.
- Cosmographia (in Latin). Paris: Guillaume Cavellat. 1558.
- Photismi de lumine et umbra ad perspectivam et radiorum incidentiam facientes (in Latin). Napolo: Tarquinio Longo. 1611.

== See also ==
- Camera obscura
- Center of mass
- Commandino's theorem
- Descartes on Polyhedra
- List of Roman Catholic scientist-clerics
- Greek scholars in the Renaissance
- Mathematical induction
- Octahedral number
- Timeline of calculus and mathematical analysis

== Sources ==
- Edizione Nazionale dell'opera matematica di Francesco Maurolico(Digital edition of the scientific works of Francesco Maurolico)]
- Francesco Maurolico
- The Galileo Project: Francesco Maurolico
- J J O'Connor and E F Robertson, "Maurolico"
- Clagett, Marshall (1988). "Archimedes", Archimedes in the Middle Ages, Volume 3. The American Philosophical Society. ISBN 0-87169-125-6
- Galluzzi, Paolo (1984). Novità celesti e crisi del sapere, Banca toscana. OCLC 59935636
- Burdick, Bruce Stanley (2009). Mathematical works printed in the Americas, 1554–1700. JHU Press. ISBN 978-0-8018-8823-6
- Boyer, Carl Benjamin; Merzbach, Uta C. (1991). A history of mathematics. Wiley. ISBN 0-471-54397-7
- Burton, David M. (1999). The history of mathematics: an introduction. WCB McGraw-Hill. ISBN 0-07-009468-3
- Scoular, Spencer (2005). The Unlimited Infinite: Exploring the Philosophy of Mathematics. Universal Publishers. ISBN 1-58112-470-8
- "MAUROLICO, Francesco" by Rosario Moscheo, Dizionario Biografico degli Italiani, Volume 72 (2008).
- Russo, Attilio (2018). "Una nuova ipotesi sul nome 'Maurolico' ", Archivio Storico Messinese, 99, Messina 2018, 37–71. ISSN 1122-701X
- Russo, Attilio (2001). '"La fontana del Sirio d'Orione, o delle metamorfosi", Città & Territorio, II/2001, Messina 2001, 30–41.
