= Guidobaldo del Monte =

Italian mathematician and astronomer (1545–1607)

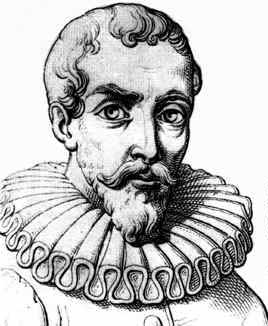
- Guidobaldo del Monte
- Born: Guidobaldo Bourbon Del Monte; January 11, 1545; Pesaro, Duchy of Urbino
- Died: 6 January 1607 (aged 61); Mombaroccio, Duchy of Urbino
- Occupations: Mathematician; Astronomer; Physicist
- Father: Ranieri Bourbon Del Monte

Academic background
- Education: University of Padua
- Influences: Archimedes; Pappus of Alexandria; Hero of Alexandria; Federico Commandino

Academic work
- Discipline: Mathematics, Physics, Astronomy
- Sub-discipline: Mechanics, Optics
- Influenced: Muzio Oddi; Galileo Galilei; Bernardino Baldi

Guidobaldo del Monte (11 January 1545 – 6 January 1607, var. Guidobaldi or Guido Baldi), Marquis del Monte, was an Italian mathematician, philosopher and astronomer of the 16th century.

== Biography ==
Del Monte was born in Pesaro. His father, Ranieri, was from a leading wealthy family in Urbino. Ranieri was noted for his role as a soldier and also as the author of two books on military architecture. The Duke of Urbino, Duke Guidobaldo II, honoured him with the title Marchese del Monte so the family had only become a noble one in the generation before Guidobaldo. On the death of his father Guidobaldo inherited the title of Marchese.

Guidobaldo studied mathematics at the University of Padua in 1564. While there he became a friend of the great Italian poet Torquato Tasso. In fact Guidobaldo may have known Tasso before they studied at Padua together, for Tasso was almost exactly the same age as Guidobaldo and had been educated at the court of the Duke of Urbino, with the duke's son, from 1556.

Guidobaldo then served as a soldier in the ensuing conflict in Hungary between the Habsburg Empire and the Ottoman Empire. After serving in the army, Guidobaldo returned to his estate of (Monte Baroccio) Mombaroccio in the Marche, where he was able to spend his time doing research into mathematics, mechanics, astronomy and optics. He studied mathematics under Federico Commandino during this period and became one of his most staunch disciples. He also became a friend of Bernardino Baldi, who was also a student of Commandino around the same time.

He corresponded with several mathematicians including Giacomo Contarini, Francesco Barozzi and Galileo Galilei. His invention of a drafting instrument for constructing regular polygons and dividing a line into any number of segments was incorporated as a feature of Galileo's geometric and military compass.

Guidobaldo was also important in helping Galileo Galilei in his academic career. Galileo, then a promising, but unemployed 26-year-old, had written an essay on hydrostatic balance, which struck Guidobaldo as being nothing short of genius. He then commended Galileo to his brother, the Cardinal Del Monte, who referred him to the powerful Duke of Tuscany, Ferdinando I de' Medici. Under the duke's patronage, in 1589 Galileo was appointed professor of mathematics at the University of Pisa. Guidobaldo became a staunch friend of Galileo and helped him again in 1592, when he applied for the chair of mathematics at the University of Padua, in the face of hatred and machinations of Giovanni de' Medici, a son of Cosimo I de' Medici. Notwithstanding their friendship, Guidobaldo was a critic of Galileo's principle of the isochronicity of the pendulum, a major discovery which Guidobaldo thought was impossible.

He discovered the vanishing point in graphical perspective, which was further developed by Simon Stevin. Several painters, architects and the theater stage designer Nicola Sabbatini used this geometrical knowledge in their works.

He died at Mombaroccio in 1607.

== Works ==
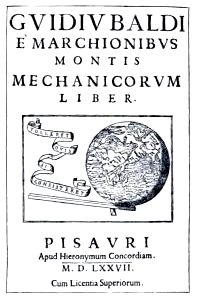
Cover of the book Mechanicorum Liber, 1577.

- Mechanicorum liber (in Latin). Pesaro: Girolamo Concordia. 1577.
- Planisphaeriorum universalium theorica (in Latin). Pesaro: Girolamo Concordia. 1579.
- Problematum astronomicorum libri septem (in Latin). Venezia: Bernardo Giunta (2.) & Giovanni Battista Ciotti & C. 1609.
