= Spherical geometry =

Geometry of the surface of a sphere

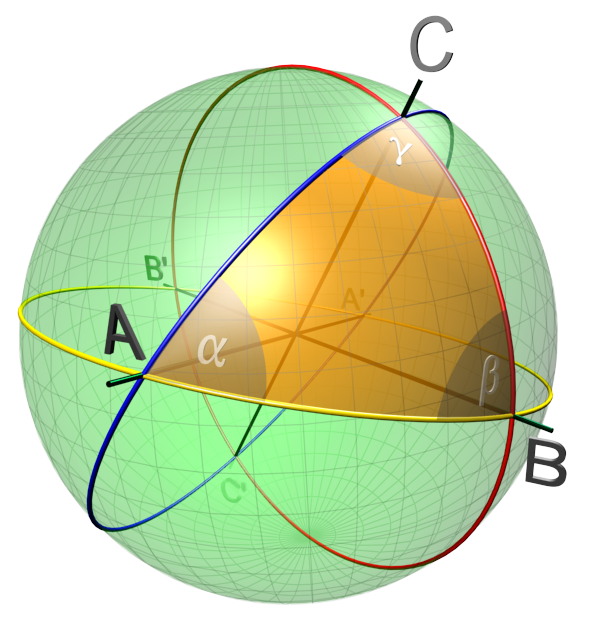
A sphere with a spherical triangle on it.

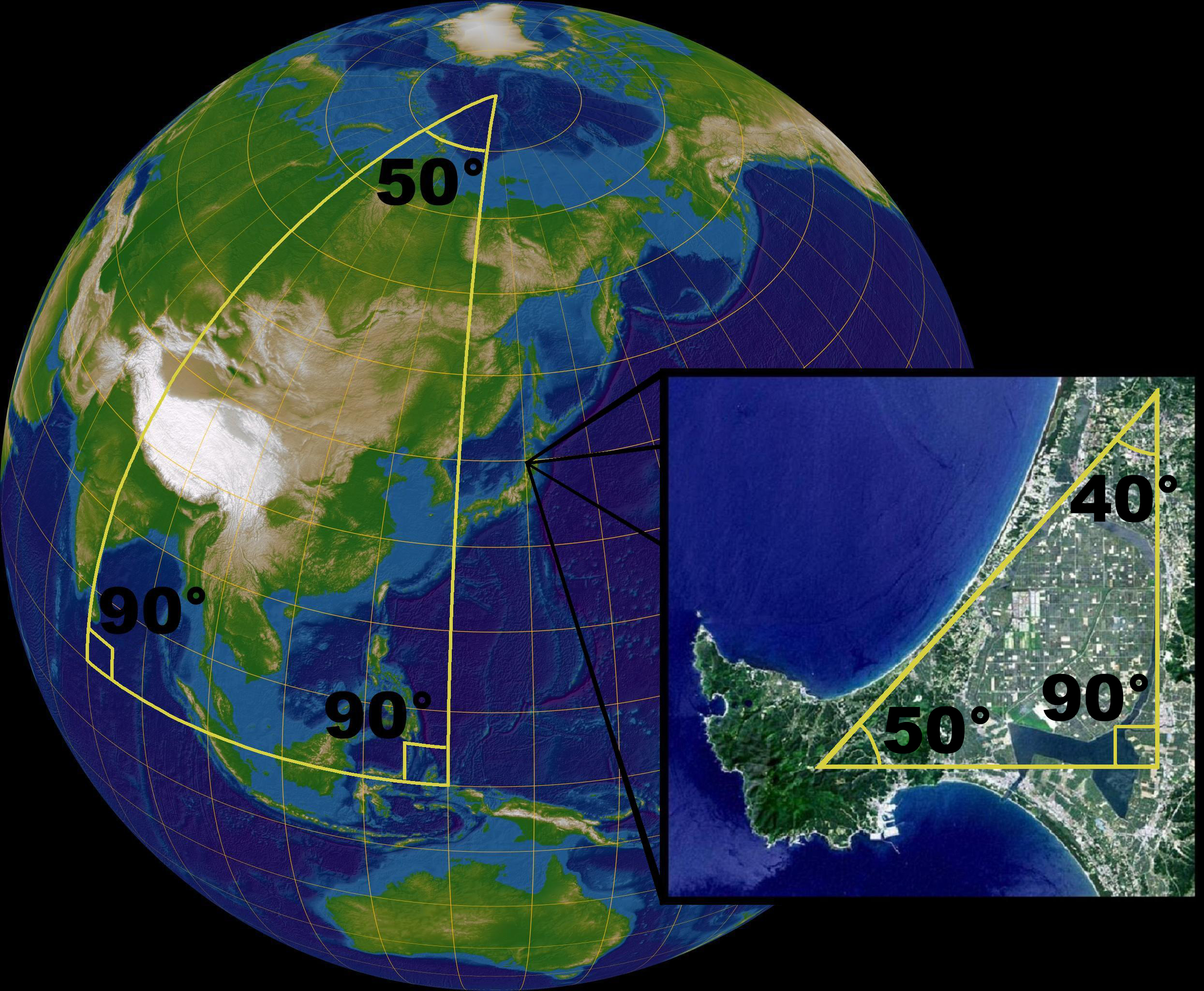
The sum of the angles of a spherical triangle is not equal to 180°. A sphere is a curved surface, but locally the laws of the flat (planar) Euclidean geometry are good approximations. In a small triangle on the face of the earth, the sum of the angles is only slightly more than 180 degrees.

Spherical geometry or spherics (from Ancient Greek σφαιρικά) is the geometry of the two-dimensional surface of a sphere (Note: In this context the word "sphere" refers only to the 2-dimensional surface and other terms like "ball" (or "solid sphere") are used for the surface together with its 3-dimensional interior.) or the n-dimensional surface of higher dimensional spheres.

Long studied for its practical applications to astronomy, navigation, and geodesy, spherical geometry and the metrical tools of spherical trigonometry are in many respects analogous to Euclidean plane geometry and trigonometry, but also have some important differences.

The sphere can be studied either extrinsically as a surface embedded in 3-dimensional Euclidean space (part of the study of solid geometry), or intrinsically using methods that only involve the surface itself without reference to any surrounding space.

== Principles ==
In plane (Euclidean) geometry, the basic concepts are points and (straight) lines. In spherical geometry, the basic concepts are points and great circles. However, two great circles on a plane intersect in two antipodal points, unlike coplanar lines in elliptic geometry.

In the extrinsic 3-dimensional picture, a great circle is the intersection of the sphere with any plane through the center. In the intrinsic approach, a great circle is a geodesic; a shortest path between any two of its points provided they are close enough. Or, in the (also intrinsic) axiomatic approach analogous to Euclid's axioms of plane geometry, "great circle" is simply an undefined term, together with postulates stipulating the basic relationships between great circles and the also-undefined "points". This is the same as Euclid's method of treating point and line as undefined primitive notions and axiomatizing their relationships.

Great circles in many ways play the same logical role in spherical geometry as lines in Euclidean geometry, e.g., as the sides of (spherical) triangles. This is more than an analogy; spherical and plane geometry and others can all be unified under the umbrella of geometry built from distance measurement, where "lines" are defined to mean shortest paths (geodesics). Many statements about the geometry of points and such "lines" are equally true in all those geometries provided lines are defined that way, and the theory can be readily extended to higher dimensions. Nevertheless, because its applications and pedagogy are tied to solid geometry, and because the generalization loses some important properties of lines in the plane, spherical geometry ordinarily does not use the term "line" at all to refer to anything on the sphere itself. If developed as a part of solid geometry, use is made of points, straight lines and planes (in the Euclidean sense) in the surrounding space.

In spherical geometry, angles are defined between great circles, resulting in a spherical trigonometry that differs from ordinary trigonometry in many respects; for example, the sum of the interior angles of a spherical triangle exceeds 180 degrees.

== Relation to similar geometries ==
Because a sphere and a plane differ geometrically, (intrinsic) spherical geometry has some features of a non-Euclidean geometry and is sometimes described as being one. However, spherical geometry was not considered a full-fledged non-Euclidean geometry sufficient to resolve the ancient problem of whether the parallel postulate is a logical consequence of the rest of Euclid's axioms of plane geometry, because it requires another axiom to be modified. The resolution was found instead in elliptic geometry, to which spherical geometry is closely related, and hyperbolic geometry; each of these new geometries makes a different change to the parallel postulate.

The principles of any of these geometries can be extended to any number of dimensions.

An important geometry related to that of the sphere is that of the real projective plane; it is obtained by identifying antipodal points (pairs of opposite points) on the sphere. Locally, the projective plane has all the properties of spherical geometry, but it has different global properties. In particular, it is non-orientable, or one-sided, and unlike the sphere it cannot be drawn as a surface in 3-dimensional space without intersecting itself.

Concepts of spherical geometry may also be applied to the oblong sphere, though minor modifications must be implemented on certain formulas.

== History ==
=== Greek antiquity ===
The earliest mathematical work of antiquity to come down to our time is On the rotating sphere (Περὶ κινουμένης σφαίρας, Peri kinoumenes sphairas) by Autolycus of Pitane, who lived at the end of the fourth century BC.

Spherical trigonometry was studied by early Greek mathematicians such as Theodosius of Bithynia, a Greek astronomer and mathematician who wrote Spherics, a book on the geometry of the sphere, and Menelaus of Alexandria, who wrote a book on spherical trigonometry called Sphaerica and developed Menelaus' theorem.

=== Islamic world ===
The Book of Unknown Arcs of a Sphere written by the Islamic mathematician Al-Jayyani is considered to be the first treatise on spherical trigonometry. The book contains formulae for right-handed triangles, the general law of sines, and the solution of a spherical triangle by means of the polar triangle.

The book On Triangles by Regiomontanus, written around 1463, is the first pure trigonometrical work in Europe. However, Gerolamo Cardano noted a century later that much of its material on spherical trigonometry was taken from the twelfth-century work of the Andalusi scholar Jabir ibn Aflah.

=== Euler's work ===
Leonhard Euler published a series of important memoirs on spherical geometry:

- L. Euler, Principes de la trigonométrie sphérique tirés de la méthode des plus grands et des plus petits, Mémoires de l'Académie des Sciences de Berlin 9 (1753), 1755, p. 233–257; Opera Omnia, Series 1, vol. XXVII, p. 277–308.
- L. Euler, Eléments de la trigonométrie sphéroïdique tirés de la méthode des plus grands et des plus petits, Mémoires de l'Académie des Sciences de Berlin 9 (1754), 1755, p. 258–293; Opera Omnia, Series 1, vol. XXVII, p. 309–339.
- L. Euler, De curva rectificabili in superficie sphaerica, Novi Commentarii academiae scientiarum Petropolitanae 15, 1771, pp. 195–216; Opera Omnia, Series 1, Volume 28, pp. 142–160.
- L. Euler, De mensura angulorum solidorum, Acta academiae scientiarum imperialis Petropolitinae 2, 1781, p. 31–54; Opera Omnia, Series 1, vol. XXVI, p. 204–223.
- L. Euler, Problematis cuiusdam Pappi Alexandrini constructio, Acta academiae scientiarum imperialis Petropolitinae 4, 1783, p. 91–96; Opera Omnia, Series 1, vol. XXVI, p. 237–242.
- L. Euler, Geometrica et sphaerica quaedam, Mémoires de l'Académie des Sciences de Saint-Pétersbourg 5, 1815, p. 96–114; Opera Omnia, Series 1, vol. XXVI, p. 344–358.
- L. Euler, Trigonometria sphaerica universa, ex primis principiis breviter et dilucide derivata, Acta academiae scientiarum imperialis Petropolitinae 3, 1782, p. 72–86; Opera Omnia, Series 1, vol. XXVI, p. 224–236.
- L. Euler, Variae speculationes super area triangulorum sphaericorum, Nova Acta academiae scientiarum imperialis Petropolitinae 10, 1797, p. 47–62; Opera Omnia, Series 1, vol. XXIX, p. 253–266.

== Properties ==
Spherical geometry has the following properties:

- Any two great circles intersect in two diametrically opposite points, called antipodal points.
- Any two distinct points that are not antipodal points determine a unique great circle.
- There is a natural unit of angle measurement (based on a revolution), a natural unit of length (based on the circumference of a great circle) and a natural unit of area (based on the area of the sphere).
- Each great circle is associated with a pair of antipodal points, called its poles which are the common intersections of the set of great circles perpendicular to it. This shows that a great circle is, with respect to distance measurement on the surface of the sphere, a circle: the locus of points all at a specific distance from a center.
- Each point is associated with a unique great circle, called the polar circle of the point, which is the great circle on the plane through the centre of the sphere and perpendicular to the diameter of the sphere through the given point.

As there are two arcs determined by a pair of points, which are not antipodal, on the great circle they determine, three non-collinear points do not determine a unique triangle. However, if we only consider triangles whose sides are minor arcs of great circles, we have the following properties:

- The angle sum of a triangle is greater than 180° and less than 540° (specifically 180°(1 + 4f), where f is the fraction of the sphere's surface that is enclosed by the triangle).
- The area of a triangle is proportional to the excess of its angle sum over 180°.
- Two triangles with the same angle sum are equal in area.
- There is an upper bound for the area of triangles.
- The composition (product) of two reflections-across-a-great-circle may be considered as a rotation about either of the points of intersection of their axes.
- Two triangles are congruent if and only if they correspond under a finite product of such reflections.
- Two triangles with corresponding angles equal are congruent (i.e., all similar triangles are congruent).

== Relation to Euclid's postulates ==
If "line" is taken to mean great circle, spherical geometry only obeys two of Euclid's five postulates: the second postulate ("to produce [extend] a finite straight line continuously in a straight line") and the fourth postulate ("that all right angles are equal to one another"). However, it violates the other three. Contrary to the first postulate ("that between any two points, there is a unique line segment joining them"), there is not a unique shortest route between any two points (antipodal points such as the north and south poles on a spherical globe are counterexamples); contrary to the third postulate, a sphere does not contain circles of arbitrarily great radius; and contrary to the fifth (parallel) postulate, there is no point through which a line can be drawn that never intersects a given line.

A statement that is equivalent to the parallel postulate is that there exists a triangle whose angles add up to 180°. Since spherical geometry violates the parallel postulate, there exists no such triangle on the surface of a sphere. The sum of the angles of a triangle on a sphere is 180°(1 + 4f), where f is the fraction of the sphere's surface that is enclosed by the triangle. For any positive value of f, this exceeds 180°.

== See also ==
- Spherical astronomy
- Spherical conic
- Spherical distance
- Spherical polyhedron
- Spherics
- Half-side formula
- Lénárt sphere
- Versor

== Sources ==
- Meserve, Bruce E. (1983) [1959], Fundamental Concepts of Geometry, Dover, ISBN 0-486-63415-9
