= Paul Ver Eecke =

Belgian mining engineer and historian of Greek mathematics

Paul-Louis Ver Eecke (23 February 1867 – 14 October 1959) was a Belgian mining engineer and historian of Greek mathematics. He produced influential French translations of the mathematical works of ancient Greece, including those of Archimedes, Pappus, and Theodosius.

Ver Eecke was born in Menen where he received an early education in Greek and Latin. He completed his secondary studies at the Royal Athenaeum in Bruges before going to study at the mining school at Liege (1888-1891). He then worked in the mining industry. While serving as an engineer for the Fortis Powder Company Ltd at Herentals, Antwerp, he was nearly killed in an explosion. His family forced him to move out of such dangerous work and he then joined the Labor Administration in 1894, then a newly created department.

He became a principal inspector but during World War I, he was forced to take leave and he studied Greek mathematical works. This would later become his most influential work and included translations into French, incorporating modern mathematical notation, of the works of Apollonius of Perga (1924), Diophantus (1926), Theodosius (1927), Serenus of Antinoe (1929), Pappus of Alexandria (1933), Euclid (1938); and the works of Didymus, Diophanes, Anthemius, and [the palimpsests of] Bobbio (1940). He became an inspector general of labor in 1922 and retired in 1923.

Although worked largely in isolation, he collaborated with Johan Ludvig Heiberg. For his contribution, Eecke was made Commander of the Order of Leopold and of the Order of the Crown, and later Grand Officer of the Order of Leopold II, Officer of the Order of Orange-Nassau by the Belgian government. He was also decorated by the Greek and French governments.
