= Shuntarō Itō =

Japanese scholar (1930–2023)

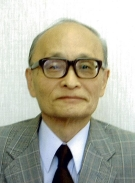

Shuntarō Itō (伊東 俊太郎, Itō Shuntarō; April 25, 1930 – September 20, 2023) was a Japanese scholar of the history of science and the study of comparative civilization. Itō was an honorary professor of University of Tokyo and International Research Center for Japanese Studies, and a professor of Reitaku University, and the Chairman of Japan Seaology Promotion Organization. He was also a president of the International Society for the Comparative Study of Civilizations.

Itō was born in Tokyo, and obtained his bachelor's degree in literature from Tokyo University in 1953, his master's in 1955, and Ph.D. from University of Wisconsin–Madison in 1964. Itō taught at the University of Tokyo, as Professor, from 1978 to 1989, and in International Research Center for Japanese Studies from 1989 to 1995, and in Reitaku University from 1995.

Itō died on September 20, 2023, at the age of 93.

== Bibliography ==
- Ito, S. The Medieval Latin Translation of the Data of Euclid. Tokyo University Press, 1980 and Birkhauser, 1998. ISBN 3-7643-3005-8

== Honours ==
- Person of Cultural Merit (2020)
