= Bernardino Baldi =

Italian mathematician, poet, translator and priest (1553–1617)

Reverend Bernardino Baldi
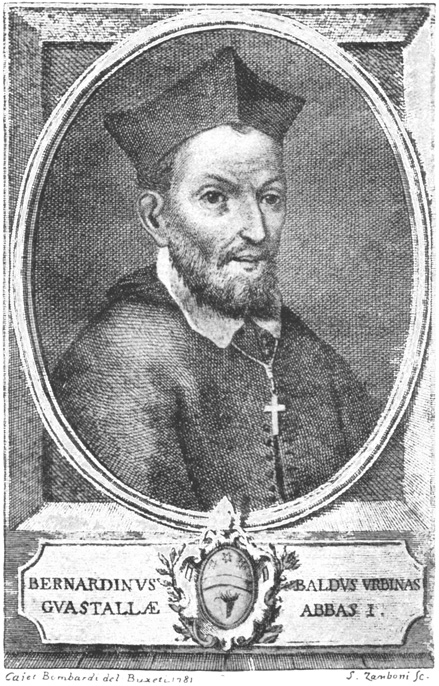
- Bernardino Baldi
- Born: June 5, 1553; Urbino, Duchy of Urbino
- Died: 10 October 1617 (aged 64); Urbino, Duchy of Urbino
- Occupations: Catholic priest; translator; mathematician; hellenist
- Title: Abbot
- Parent(s): Francesco Baldi and Virginia Baldi (née Montanari)

Academic background
- Education: University of Padua
- Influences: Federico Commandino; Guidobaldo del Monte

Academic work
- Discipline: Mathematics; Classics
- Sub-discipline: History of Mathematics

Bernardino Baldi (5 June 1553 – 10 October 1617) was an Italian mathematician, poet, translator and priest.

== Biography ==
Baldi descended from a noble family from Urbino, Marche, where he was born. He pursued his studies at Padua, and is said to have spoken about sixteen languages during his lifetime, though according to Tiraboschi the inscription on his tomb limits the number to twelve.

The appearance of the plague at Padua forced him to return to his native city. Shortly afterwards he was called to act as tutor to Ferrante Gonzaga, from whom he received the rich abbey of Guastalla. The oldest biography of Nicolaus Copernicus was completed on 7 October 1588 by him. He held office as abbot for 25 years, and then returned once again to Urbino. In 1612, he was employed by the duke as his envoy to Venice. Baldi died at Urbino on 12 October 1617.

He is said to have written upwards of a hundred different works, the chief part of which have remained unpublished. His various works show his abilities as a theologian, mathematician, geographer, antiquary, historian and poet. His Cronica dei Matematici, a collection of lives of mathematicians, from antiquity to his own time, was conceived in emulation of Vasari's Lives, and was intended to contain the lives of more than two hundred mathematicians. The work was not published in the Renaissance, but an abridgement appeared in Urbino in 1707. His life has been written of by Ireneo Affò and Giammaria Mazzucchelli, among others.

== See also ==
- List of Roman Catholic scientist-clerics

== Writing ==
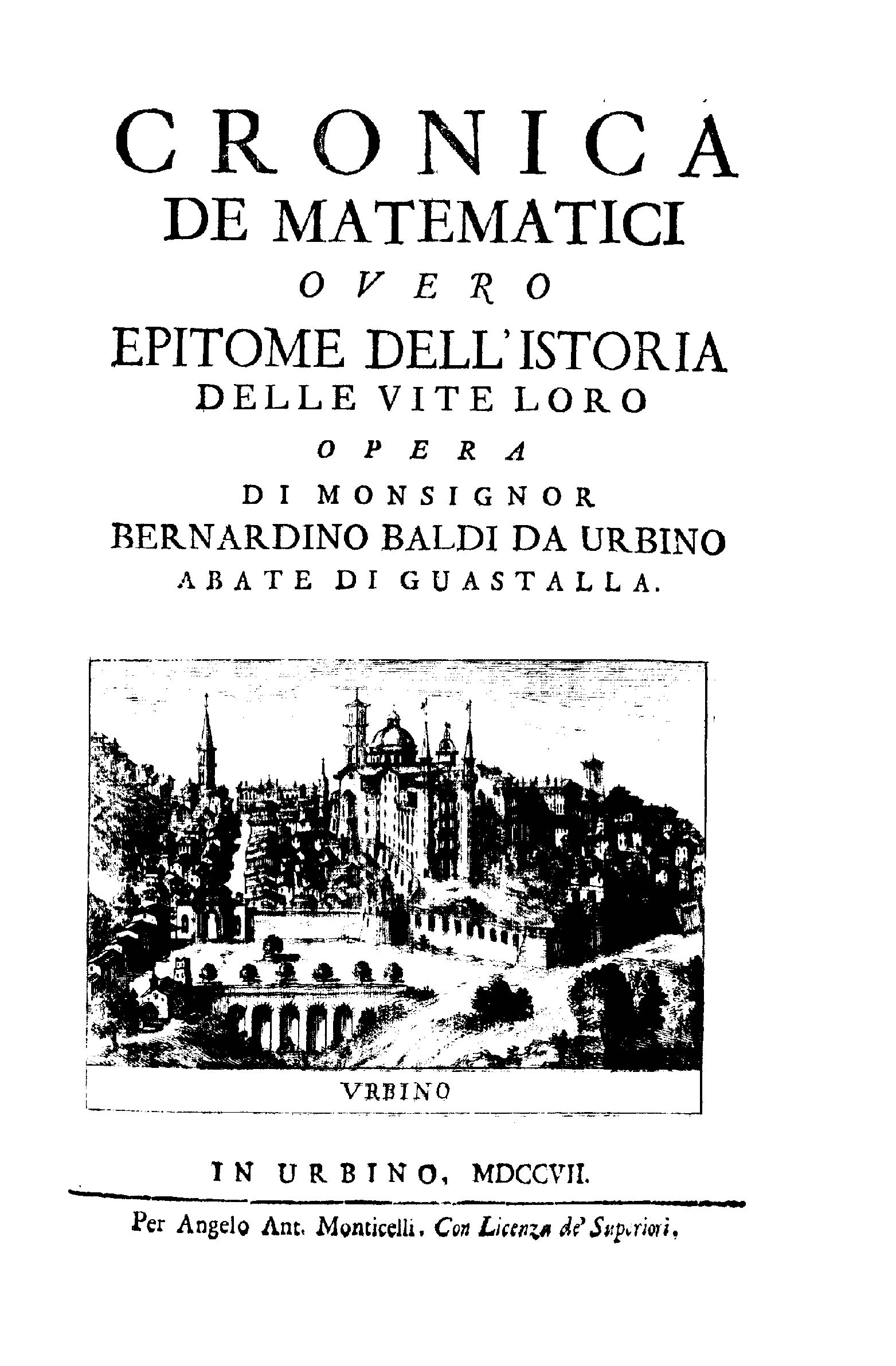
Cronica de matematici, 1707

=== Scientific works ===
- De gli automati, overo machine se moventi, Libri 2 (Venice, 1589; repr. 1601), On Automatons; Author: Hero of Alexandria, translated from the Greek
- Scamilli impares Vitruviani (Augsburg, 1612)
- De Vitruvianorum verborum significatione (Augsburg, 1612) -- a.k.a. Lexicon Vitruvianum
- Heronis Ctesibii Belopoeeca (Augsburg, 1616)
- In mechanica Aristotelis problemata exercitationes. (Aristotle's Mechanics) (Mainz, 1621)
- Cronica de matematici, overo Epitome dell'istoria delle vite loro (Urbino, 1707)

=== Other works ===
- La corona dell'anno (Venice, 1589)
- Versi e Prose di Monsignor Bernardino Baldi da Urbino (Venice, 1590)
- Il Lauro, scherzo giouenile (Pavia, 1600)
- La Deifobe, overo gli oracoli della Sibilla Cumea Monodia (Venice, 1604) (About the Oracles of the Cumaean Sibyl)
- Il Diluvio universale, cantato, con nuova maniera di versi (Pavia, 1604)
- Concetti morali (Rome, 1607)
- Oratione di Bernardino Baldi ... alla Serenità del nouvo Duce M. Antonio Memmo (Venice, 1613)
- In tabvlam aeneam Evgvbinam, lingua Hetrusca veteri perscriptam, divinatio (Augusta Vindelicorum, 1613)
- La Nautica: Poema
- Encomio della patria (1706)
