= Armengaud Blaise =

Translator in Aragon (d. 1312)

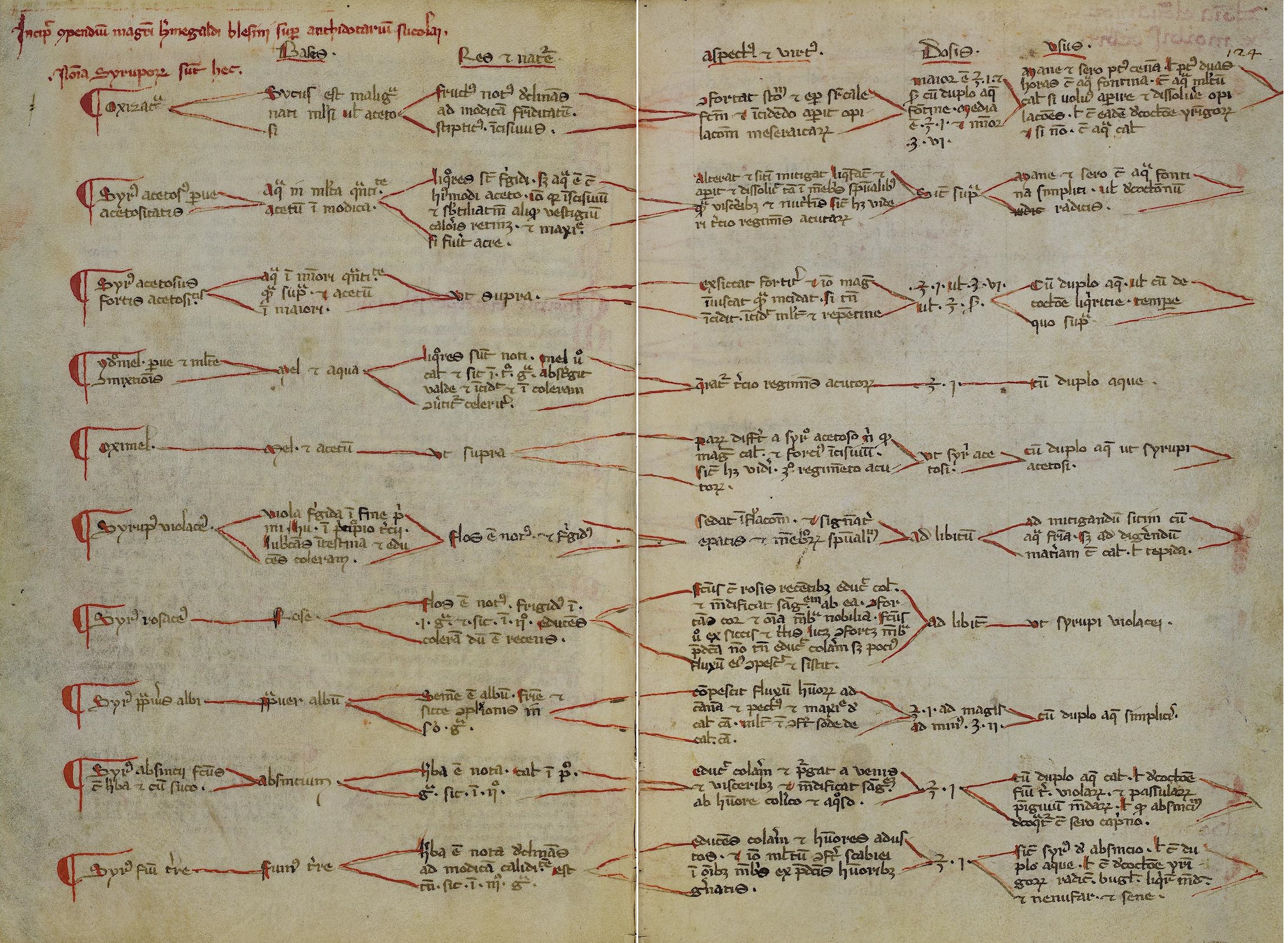
First pages of the Tabula antidotarii in the earliest copy.

Armengaud Blaise (died 1312) was a physician, translator and author active in the Crown of Aragon and Papal Avignon. He mainly translated Arabic medical works into Latin, but he also made one translation from Hebrew with the help of a Jewish friend. Authors he translated include Galen, Avicenna and Maimonides. He wrote two original medical works in Latin, one of which was soon afterwards translated into Hebrew.

== Life ==
Armengaud Blaise was a nephew of Arnau de Vilanova, as a son of a brother of Arnau's wife, Agnes. He studied medicine at the University of Montpellier. In 1289, he received his doctorate from the bishop, Berengar Fredol, over the objections of the faculty. In September 1296, he was working in Girona. Probably through the influence of his uncle, who joined the faculty of Montpellier in the 1290s, Armengaud had returned to the city by 1299.

In 1301, Armengaud was the personal physician of Queen Blanche of Aragon, living at Barcelona and occasionally attending court. In 1303, King James II appointed him his personal physician as well and Armengaud lived at the royal court for the next three years. He visited his uncle in Montpellier in July 1305. Between October 1306 and January 1307, he left the court of Aragon to become the physician of Pope Clement V at Avignon. In May 1309, he secured ecclesiastical benefices for his two underaged sons, Thomas and Bernard. He died in 1312.

== Works ==
Armengaud made five translations and wrote two original works, all in Latin. He translated the Cantica of Avicenna with the commentary of Averroes directly from the Arabic at Montpellier in 1283 or 1284. He completed a translation of Galen's De cognitione vicium, previously translated into Arabic from Greek, at Montpellier in 1299.

In 1290, Armengaud translated into Latin the Quadrans circuli of Jacob ben Machir. The explicit of this translation specifies that it was made de hebreo in Latinum ... secundum vocem eius ("from Hebrew into Latin according to his speech"), which may mean that Jacob translated his own work from Hebrew into his vernacular Romance so that Armengaud could put it into Latin.

In 1294, Armengaud translated the De asmate of Maimonides. According to the colophon, this was made ab arabico mediante fideli interprete ("from Arabic through a faithful interpreter"). This indicates that Armengaud could not read the Hebrew letters in which Maimonides' Arabic was written and needed to have it read aloud to him, possibly by Jacob ben Machir. In late 1305, he completed a translation of Maimonides' De venenis at Barcelona, presumably by the same method. He dedicated it to Clement V.

Armengaud's Aphorismi survives in a single manuscript. It contains some two dozen gnomic statements on diet and urine, modelled on the Aphorisms of Hippocrates and the Parabole medicationis of Arnau, which his uncle completed in 1300. Armengaud's Tabula antidotarii is a table of a medicinal compounds that survives in seven manuscripts. There is a lot of variation between copies. The number of compounds contained in the table varies from 49 to 73. The original probably contained 68. There are six columns in the table. One for the name of the compound and five for its constituents, physical characteristics, medicinal properties, dosage and manner of administration. From an early date, the Tabula was thought to be derived from the Antidotarium Nicolai, but it seems to be an independent work. In 1306, following the expulsion of the Jews from France, the Tabula antidotarii was translated into Hebrew in Barcelona by Estori ha-Parḥi, a friend of Jacob ben Machir. There are three copies of the Hebrew translation.

== Bibliography ==
- McVaugh, Michael R. (1997). "Armengaud Blaise as a Translator of Galen". In Edith Sylla; Michael R. McVaugh (eds.). Texts and Contexts in Ancient and Medieval Science: Studies on the Occasion of John E. Murdoch's Seventieth Birthday. Brill. pp. 115–134. doi:10.1163/9789004247321.
- McVaugh, Michael R. (2011). "The Medieval Appropriation of Maimonides" (PDF). IMF–CSIC Working Papers. 1: 5–15.
- McVaugh, Michael R., ed. (2019). "Latin Translations". Maimonides, On the Regimen of Health: A New Parallel Arabic–English Translation. The Medical Works of Moses Maimonides. Vol. 12. Brill. pp. 225–335. doi:10.1163/9789004394193.
- McVaugh, Michael R.; Ferre, Lola, eds. (2000). "The Tabula Antidotarii of Armengaud Blaise and Its Hebrew Translation". Transactions of the American Philosophical Society. New series. 90 (6): 1–218. JSTOR 1586009.
- Shatzmiller, Joseph (2002). "Review of McVaugh & Ferre 2000". Bulletin of the History of Medicine. 76 (2): 358–359. doi:10.1353/bhm.2002.0095.
- Thorndike, Lynn (1923). A History of Magic and Experimental Science During the First Thirteen Centuries of Our Era. Vol. 2. Macmillan.
- Thorndike, Lynn (1937). "Date of the Translation by Ermengaud Blasius of the Work on the Quadrant by Profatius Judaeus". Isis. 26 (2): 306–309. doi:10.1086/347177.
