= Paul Guldin =

Swiss mathematician and astronomer (1577–1643)

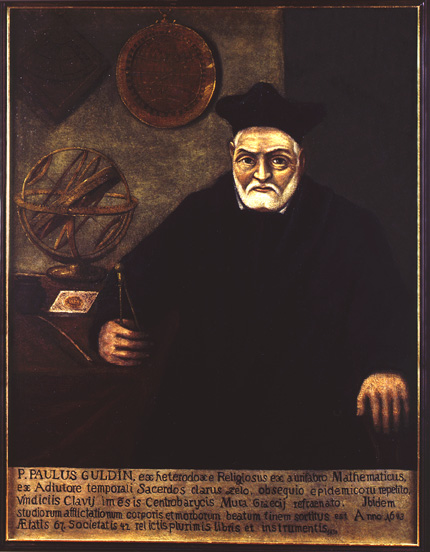
- Paul Guldin
- Born: 12 June 1577; Mels, Switzerland
- Died: 3 November 1643 (aged 66); Graz, Austria
- Other names: Habakkuk Guldin
- Occupations: Jesuit mathematician astronomer
- Known for: Guldinus theorem

Paul Guldin (born Habakkuk Guldin; 12 June 1577 (Mels) – 3 November 1643 (Graz)) was a Swiss Jesuit mathematician and astronomer. He discovered the Guldinus theorem to determine the surface and the volume of a solid of revolution. (This theorem is also known as the Pappus–Guldinus theorem and Pappus's centroid theorem, attributed to Pappus of Alexandria.) Guldin was noted for his association with the German mathematician and astronomer Johannes Kepler. Guldin composed a critique of Cavalieri's method of Indivisibles.

Although of Jewish descent, his parents were Protestants and they brought Guldin up in that faith. He was a professor of mathematics in Graz and Vienna.

In Paolo Casati's astronomical work Terra machinis mota (1658), Casati imagines a dialogue among Guldin, Galileo, and Marin Mersenne on various intellectual problems of cosmology, geography, astronomy and geodesy.

== Plagiarism controversy ==
A debate exists in mathematical history regarding whether Paul Guldin should be considered a plagiarist for his famous theorem on volumes of revolution. This theorem, published in his 1641 work Centrobaryca, states that the volume generated by a plane figure rotated about a straight line equals the product of the figure's area and the length of the circumference described by its centre of gravity.

The controversy centres on the fact that a similar theorem appears in the works of the Greek mathematician Pappus of Alexandria (c. late 3rd century CE), which were published in 1588, 1589, and 1602—approximately a generation before Guldin's publication. In Pappus' work, as translated by Heath, he states: "Figures generated by a complete revolution of a plane figure about an axis are in a ratio compounded (1) of the ratio of the areas of the figures, and (2) of the ratio of the straight lines similarly drawn to the axes of rotation from the respective centres of gravity".

In a 1926 article in Science, George Abram Miller and David Eugene Smith presented opposing views on this matter. Miller argued that Guldin may not have known about Pappus' theorem, citing mathematician Johannes Tropfke's opinion that Guldin was unaware of Pappus' somewhat vaguer formulation. Miller noted that other contemporaries of Guldin, including Johannes Kepler, appeared to know the principle but similarly failed to credit Pappus. Miller suggested this might reflect the period's common practice of illustrating mathematical principles through examples rather than explicit formulations.

Smith countered that it was "quite inconceivable" that a mathematician of Guldin's stature would be unaware of such an important statement in Pappus' widely-known work, which constituted "the most important geometric work of the late Greek period". Smith maintained that Guldin's Latin formulation (quantitas rotunda in viam rotationis ducta producit Potestatem Rotundam uno grado altiorem Potestate sive Quantitate Rotata) did not demonstrate greater clarity than Pappus' earlier version.

== Relationship with Kepler ==
Paul Guldin maintained a significant correspondence with the renowned astronomer Johannes Kepler between 1618 and 1628. This relationship, though between men of opposing religious backgrounds—Guldin a Jesuit and Kepler a Protestant—proved beneficial to both scholars, particularly to Kepler during challenging periods in his career.

Their correspondence encompassed a range of topics, including Kepler's financial difficulties, problems with publishing his works, astronomical questions, and religious themes. Guldin provided valuable assistance to Kepler, including helping to secure a telescope through his colleague Niccolò Zucchi, offering advice on scientific problems, and forwarding Kepler's petition to the imperial court in Vienna. Guldin appears to have been an influential figure at the imperial court, making his support particularly valuable.

Scholars have suggested the Jesuits' scientific dispute with Galilei may have constituted an additional reason for their interest in and sympathy for Kepler. Evidence indicates Guldin hoped to find arguments in Kepler's treatise Hyperaspistes to support the Jesuits' position in their debate with Galilei about comets.

The correspondence appears to have ceased in 1628, possibly due to theological differences that became increasingly apparent in their later letters. After Kepler expressed discomfort with Guldin's expectation of his possible conversion to Catholicism, Guldin did not reply personally but instead tasked another, unknown Jesuit with responding. Alternatively, the cessation could be attributed to Kepler's changed circumstances when he entered Albrecht von Wallenstein's service and moved to Sagan, eliminating his need for Guldin's assistance with publishing or court matters. Of the correspondence, eleven letters from Kepler to Guldin are preserved, while only one letter to Kepler (written by another Jesuit on Guldin's behalf) survives.

== See also ==
- List of Catholic clergy scientists
