= Pappus's centroid theorem =

Results on the surface areas and volumes of surfaces and solids of revolution

The theorem applied to an open cylinder, cone and a sphere to obtain their surface areas. The centroids are at a distance a (in red) from the axis of rotation.

In mathematics, Pappus's centroid theorem (also known as the Guldinus theorem, Pappus–Guldinus theorem or Pappus's theorem) is either of two related theorems dealing with the surface areas and volumes of surfaces and solids of revolution.

The theorems are attributed to Pappus of Alexandria (Note: See: They who look at these things are hardly exalted, as were the ancients and all who wrote the finer things. When I see everyone occupied with the rudiments of mathematics and of the material for inquiries that nature sets before us, I am ashamed; I for one have proved things that are much more valuable and offer much application. In order not to end my discourse declaiming this with empty hands, I will give this for the benefit of the readers: The ratio of solids of complete revolution is compounded of (that) of the revolved figures and (that) of the straight lines similarly drawn to the axes from the centers of gravity in them; that of (solids of) incomplete (revolution) from (that) of the revolved figures and (that) of the arcs that the centers of gravity in them describe, where the (ratio) of these arcs is, of course, (compounded) of (that) of the (lines) drawn and (that) of the angles of revolution that their extremities contain, if these (lines) are also at (right angles) to the axes. These propositions, which are practically a single one, contain many theorems of all kinds, for curves and surfaces and solids, all at once and by one proof, things not yet and things already demonstrated, such as those in the twelfth book of the First Elements. — Pappus, Collection, Book VII, ¶41‒42) and Paul Guldin. (Note: "Quantitas rotanda in viam rotationis ducta, producit Potestatem Rotundam uno gradu altiorem, Potestate sive Quantitate rotata." That is: "A quantity in rotation, multiplied by its circular trajectory, creates a circular power of higher degree, power, or quantity in rotation.") Pappus's statement of this theorem appears in print for the first time in 1659, but it was known before, by Kepler in 1615 and by Guldin in 1640.

== The first theorem ==
The first theorem states that the surface area A of a surface of revolution generated by rotating a plane curve C about an axis external to C and on the same plane is equal to the product of the arc length s of C and the distance d traveled by the geometric centroid of C:
$$A = sd.$$

For example, the surface area of the torus with minor radius r and major radius R is
$$A = (2\pi r)(2\pi R) = 4\pi^2 R r.$$

=== Proof ===
A curve given by the positive function $f(x)$ is bounded by two points given by:

$a \geq 0$ and $b \geq a$

If $dL$ is an infinitesimal line element tangent to the curve, the length of the curve is given by:

$$L = \int_a^b dL = \int_a^b \sqrt{dx^2 + dy^2} = \int_a^b \sqrt{1 + \left(\frac{dy}{dx}\right)^2} \, dx$$

$y$ component of the centroid of this curve is:

$$\bar{y} = \frac{1}{L} \int_a^b y \, dL = \frac{1}{L} \int_a^b y \sqrt{1 + \left(\frac{dy}{dx}\right)^2} \, dx$$

The area of the surface generated by rotating the curve around the x-axis is given by:

$$A = 2 \pi \int_a^b y \, dL  = 2 \pi \int_a^b y \sqrt{1 + \left(\frac{dy}{dx}\right)^2} \, dx$$

Using the last two equations to eliminate the integral we have:

$$A = 2 \pi \bar{y} L$$

== The second theorem ==
The second theorem states that the volume V of a solid of revolution generated by rotating a plane figure F about an external axis is equal to the product of the area A of F and the distance d traveled by the geometric centroid of F. (The centroid of F is usually different from the centroid of its boundary curve C.) That is:
$$V = Ad.$$

For example, the volume of the torus with minor radius r and major radius R is
$$V = (\pi r^2)(2\pi R) = 2\pi^2 R r^2.$$

This special case was derived by Johannes Kepler using infinitesimals. (Note: Theorem XVIII of Kepler's Nova Stereometria Doliorum Vinariorum (1615): "Omnis annulus sectionis circularis vel ellipticae est aequalis cylindro, cujus altitudo aequat longitudinem circumferentiae, quam centrum figurae circumductae descripsit, basis vero eadem est cum sectione annuli." Translation: "Any ring whose cross-section is circular or elliptic is equal to a cylinder whose height equals the length of the circumference covered by the center of the figure during its circular movement, and whose base is equal to the section of the ring.")

=== Proof 1 ===
The area bounded by the two functions:

$$y = f(x) , \, \qquad y \geq 0$$

$$y = g(x) , \, \qquad f(x) \geq g(x)$$

and bounded by the two lines:

$x = a \geq 0$ and $x = b \geq a$

is given by:

$$A = \int_a^b dA  = \int_a^b [f(x) - g(x)] \, dx$$

The $x$ component of the centroid of this area is given by:

$$\bar{x} = \frac{1}{A} \, \int_a^b x \, [f(x) - g(x)] \, dx$$

If this area is rotated about the y-axis, the volume generated can be calculated using the shell method. It is given by:

$$V = 2 \pi \int_a^b x \, [f(x) - g(x)] \, dx$$

Using the last two equations to eliminate the integral we have:

$$V = 2 \pi \bar{x} A$$

=== Proof 2 ===
Let $A$ be the area of $F$, $W$ the solid of revolution of $F$, and $V$ the volume of $W$. Suppose $F$ starts in the $xz$-plane and rotates around the $z$-axis. The distance of the centroid of $F$ from the $z$-axis is its $x$-coordinate
$$R = \frac{\int_F x\,dA}{A},$$
and the theorem states that
$$V = Ad = A \cdot 2\pi R = 2\pi\int_F x\,dA.$$

To show this, let $F$ be in the xz-plane, parametrized by $\mathbf{\Phi}(u,v) = (x(u,v),0,z(u,v))$ for $(u,v)\in F^*$, a parameter region. Since $\boldsymbol{\Phi}$ is essentially a mapping from $\mathbb{R}^2$ to $\mathbb{R}^2$, the area of $F$ is given by the change of variables formula:
$$A = \int_F dA = \iint_{F^*} \left|\frac{\partial(x,z)}{\partial(u,v)}\right|\,du\,dv = \iint_{F^*} \left|\frac{\partial x}{\partial u} \frac{\partial z}{\partial v} - \frac{\partial x}{\partial v} \frac{\partial z}{\partial u}\right|\,du\,dv,$$
where $\left|\tfrac{\partial(x,z)}{\partial(u,v)}\right|$ is the determinant of the Jacobian matrix of the change of variables.

The solid $W$ has the toroidal parametrization $\boldsymbol{\Phi}(u,v,\theta) = (x(u,v)\cos\theta,x(u,v)\sin\theta,z(u,v))$ for $(u,v,\theta)$ in the parameter region $W^* = F^*\times [0,2\pi]$; and its volume is
$$V = \int_W dV = \iiint_{W^*} \left|\frac{\partial(x,y,z)}{\partial(u,v,\theta)}\right|\,du\,dv\,d\theta.$$

Expanding,
$$\begin{align}
\left|\frac{\partial(x,y,z)}{\partial(u,v,\theta)}\right| & =
\left|\det\begin{bmatrix}
\frac{\partial x}{\partial u}\cos\theta & \frac{\partial x}{\partial v}\cos\theta & -x\sin\theta \\[6pt]
\frac{\partial x}{\partial u}\sin\theta & \frac{\partial x}{\partial v}\sin\theta &  x\cos\theta \\[6pt]
\frac{\partial z}{\partial u}           & \frac{\partial z}{\partial v}           &  0
\end{bmatrix}\right| \\[5pt]
& = \left|-\frac{\partial z}{\partial v}\frac{\partial x}{\partial u}\,x + \frac{\partial z}{\partial u}\frac{\partial x}{\partial v}\,x\right|
=\ \left|-x\,\frac{\partial(x,z)}{\partial(u,v)}\right| = x\left|\frac{\partial(x,z)}{\partial(u,v)}\right|.
\end{align}$$

The last equality holds because the axis of rotation must be external to $F$, meaning $x \geq 0$. Now,
$$\begin{align}
V &= \iiint_{W^*} \left|\frac{\partial(x,y,z)}{\partial(u,v,\theta)}\right|\,du\,dv\,d\theta \\[1ex]
&= \int_0^{2\pi}\!\!\!\!\iint_{F^*} x(u,v)\left|\frac{\partial(x,z)}{\partial(u,v)}\right| du\,dv\,d\theta \\[6pt]
& = 2\pi\iint_{F^*} x(u,v)\left|\frac{\partial(x,z)}{\partial(u,v)}\right|\,du\,dv \\[1ex]
&= 2\pi\int_F x\,dA
\end{align}$$
by change of variables.

== Generalizations ==
The theorems can be generalized for arbitrary curves and shapes, under appropriate conditions.

Goodman & Goodman generalize the second theorem as follows. If the figure F moves through space so that it remains perpendicular to the curve L traced by the centroid of F, then it sweeps out a solid of volume V = Ad, where A is the area of F and d is the length of L. (This assumes the solid does not intersect itself.) In particular, F may rotate about its centroid during the motion.

However, the corresponding generalization of the first theorem is only true if the curve L traced by the centroid lies in a plane perpendicular to the plane of C.

== In n-dimensions ==
In general, one can generate an $n$ dimensional solid by rotating an $n-p$ dimensional solid $F$ around a $p$ dimensional sphere. This is called an $n$-solid of revolution of species $p$. Let the $p$-th centroid of $F$ be defined by

$$R = \frac{\iint_F x^p\,dA}{A},$$

Then Pappus' theorems generalize to:

Volume of $n$-solid of revolution of species $p$
= (Volume of generating $(n{-}p)$-solid) $\times$ (Surface area of $p$-sphere traced by the $p$-th centroid of the generating solid)

and

Surface area of $n$-solid of revolution of species $p$
= (Surface area of generating $(n{-}p)$-solid) $\times$ (Surface area of $p$-sphere traced by the $p$-th centroid of the generating solid)

The original theorems are the case with $n=3,\, p = 1$.
