= Pappus of Alexandria =

4th-century Greek mathematician (c. 290–350)

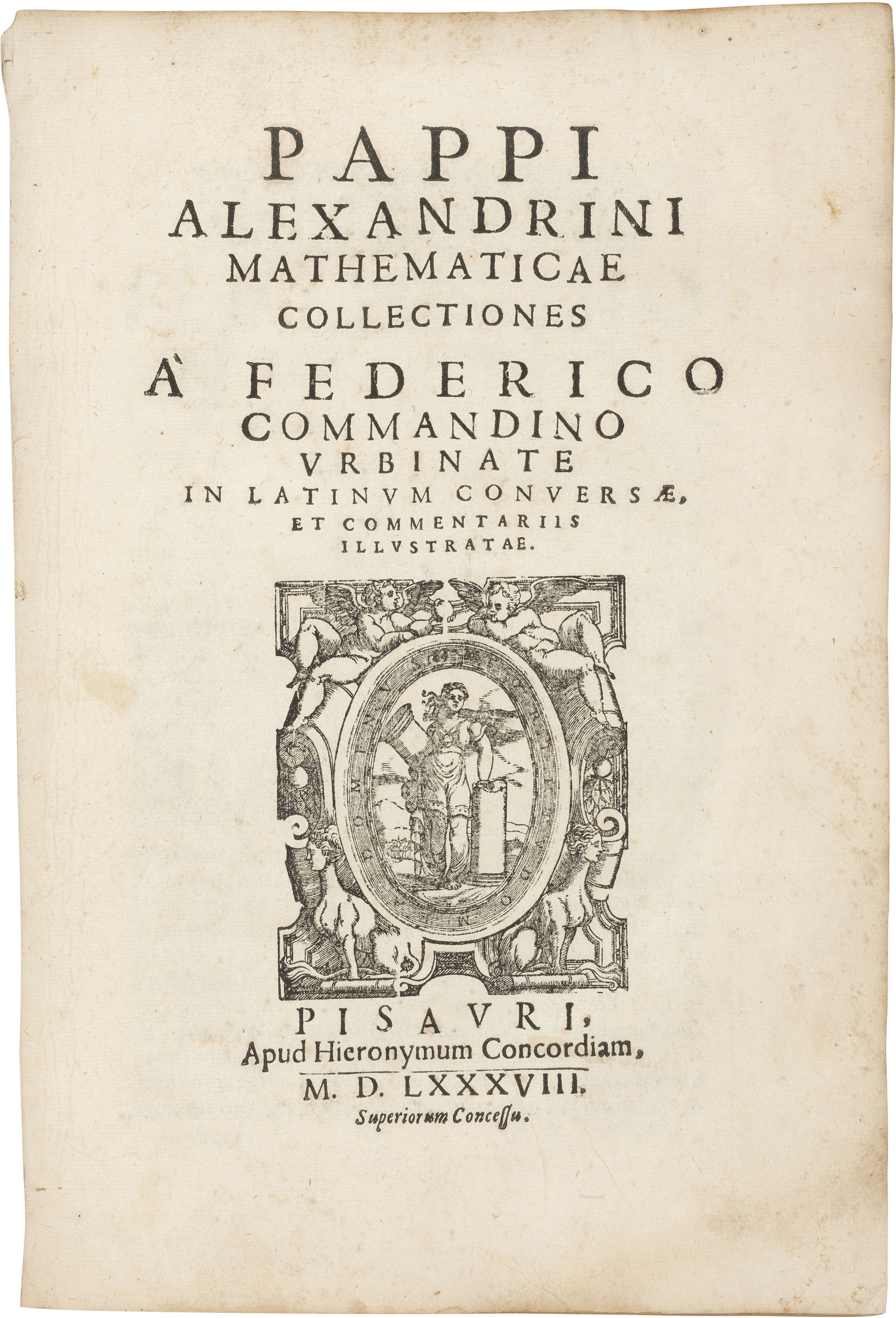
Title page of Pappus's Mathematicae Collectiones, translated into Latin by Federico Commandino (1588).

Pappus of Alexandria (/ˈpæpəs/; Ancient Greek: Πάππος ὁ Ἀλεξανδρεύς; c. 290 – c. 350 AD) was a Greek mathematician of late antiquity known for his Synagoge (Ancient Greek: Συναγωγή) or Collection (c. 340), and for Pappus's hexagon theorem in projective geometry. Almost nothing is known about his life except for what can be found in his own writings, many of which are lost. Pappus appears to have lived in Alexandria, where he worked as a mathematics teacher to higher level students, one of whom was named Hermodorus.

The Collection, his best-known work, is a compendium of mathematics in eight volumes, the bulk of which survives. It covers a wide range of topics that were part of the ancient mathematics curriculum, including geometry, astronomy, and mechanics.

Pappus was active in a period generally considered one of stagnation in mathematical studies, in which context he provides, to some, a remarkable exception and, to others, an exemplar of the ills that halted the progress of Greek science. In many respects, his fate strikingly resembles that of Diophantus'; his work was of limited importance throughout earlier centuries, but became very influential in the late Renaissance and Early Modern periods.

== Dating ==
In his surviving writings, Pappus gives no indication of the date of the authors whose works he makes use of, or of the time (but see below) when he himself wrote. If no other date information were available, all that could be known would be that he was later than Ptolemy (died c. 168), whom he quotes, and earlier than Proclus (born c. 411), who quotes him.

The 10th century Suda states that Pappus was of the same age as Theon of Alexandria, who was active in the reign of Emperor Theodosius I (372–395). A different date is given by a marginal note to a late 10th-century manuscript (a copy of a chronological table by the same Theon), which states, next to an entry on Emperor Diocletian (r. 284–305), that "at that time wrote Pappus".

However, a verifiable date comes from the dating of a solar eclipse mentioned by Pappus himself. In his commentary on the Almagest he calculates "the place and time of conjunction which gave rise to the eclipse in Tybi in 1068 after Nabonassar". This works out as 18 October 320, and so Pappus must have been active around 320.

== Works ==
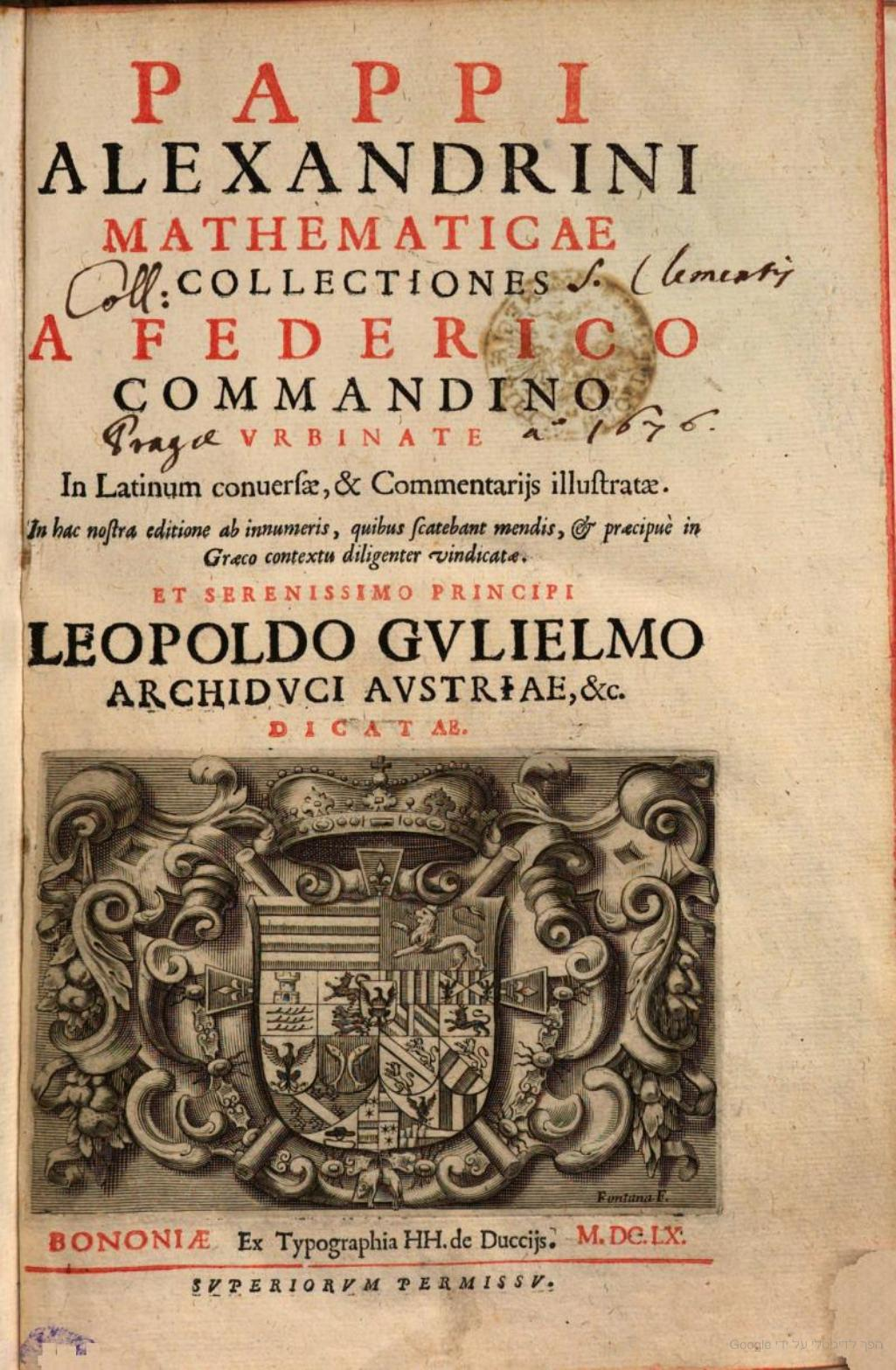
Mathematicae collectiones, 1660

The great work of Pappus, in eight books and titled Synagoge or Collection, has not survived in complete form: the first book is lost, and the rest have suffered considerably. The Suda enumerates other works of Pappus: Description of the Inhabited World (Ancient Greek: Χωρογραφία οἰκουμενική, romanized: Chorographia oikoumenike), a commentary on the thirteen books of Ptolemy's Almagest (of which the part on books 5 and 6 survives), The Rivers in Libya (Ancient Greek: Ποταμοὺς τοὺς ἐν Λιβύῃ), and The Interpretation of Dreams (Ancient Greek: Ὀνειροκριτικά). Pappus himself mentions another commentary of his own on the Ἀνάλημμα (Analemma) of Diodorus of Alexandria. Pappus also wrote commentaries on Euclid's Elements (of which fragments are preserved in Proclus and the Scholia, while that on the tenth Book has been found in an Arabic manuscript), and on Ptolemy's Ἁρμονικά (Harmonika).

Federico Commandino translated the Collection of Pappus into Latin in 1588. The German classicist and mathematical historian Friedrich Hultsch (1833–1908) published a definitive three-volume presentation of Commandino's translation with both the Greek and Latin versions (Berlin, 1875–1878). Using Hultsch's work, the Belgian mathematical historian Paul ver Eecke was the first to publish a translation of the Collection into a modern European language; his two-volume, French translation has the title French: Pappus d'Alexandrie. La Collection Mathématique. (Paris and Bruges, 1933).

== Collection ==
Pappus's Collection contains an account, systematically arranged, of the most important results obtained by his predecessors and notes explanatory of, or extending, previous discoveries. These discoveries form, in fact, a text upon which Pappus enlarges discursively. Heath considered the systematic introductions to the various books valuable, for they set forth clearly an outline of the contents and the general scope of the subjects to be treated. In these introductions, the style of Pappus's writing is excellent and even elegant the moment he is free from the shackles of mathematical formulae and expressions. Heath also found his characteristic exactness made his Collection "a most admirable substitute for the texts of the many valuable treatises of earlier mathematicians of which time has deprived us".

The surviving portions of Collection can be summarized as follows.

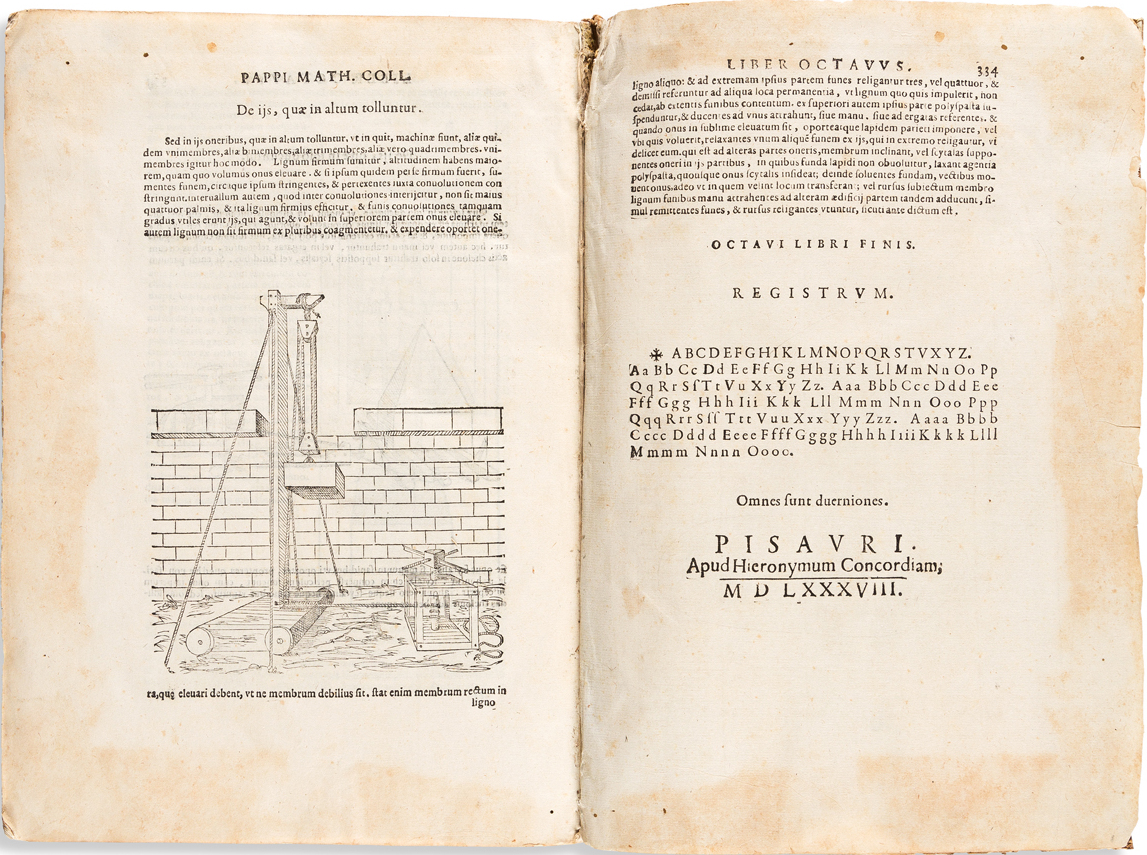
Pages from Mathematicae Collectiones, published in Venice in 1589.

=== Book I ===
Book I has been lost. Book I, like Book II, may have been concerned with arithmetic, as Book III is clearly introduced as beginning a new subject.

=== Book II ===
The whole of Book II (the former part of which is lost, the existing fragment beginning in the middle of the 14th proposition) discusses a method of multiplication from an unnamed book by Apollonius of Perga. The final propositions deal with multiplying together the numerical values of Greek letters in two lines of poetry, producing two very large numbers approximately equal to 2×10^{54} and 2×10^{38}.

=== Book III ===
Book III contains geometrical problems, plane and solid. It may be divided into five sections:

1. On the famous problem of finding two mean proportionals between two given lines, which arose from that of duplicating the cube, reduced by Hippocrates of Chios to the former. Pappus gives several solutions of this problem, including a method of making successive approximations to the solution, the significance of which he apparently failed to appreciate; he adds his own solution of the more general problem of finding geometrically the side of a cube whose content is in any given ratio to that of a given one.
2. On the arithmetic, geometric and harmonic means between two straight lines, and the problem of representing all three in one and the same geometrical figure. This serves as an introduction to a general theory of means, of which Pappus distinguishes ten kinds, and gives a table representing examples of each in whole numbers.
3. On a curious problem suggested by Euclid I. 21.
4. On the inscribing of each of the five regular polyhedra in a sphere. Here Pappus observed that a regular dodecahedron and a regular icosahedron could be inscribed in the same sphere such that their vertices all lay on the same 4 circles of latitude, with 3 of the icosahedron's 12 vertices on each circle, and 5 of the dodecahedron's 20 vertices on each circle. This observation has been generalised to higher dimensional dual polytopes.
5. An addition by a later writer on another solution of the first problem of the book.

=== Book IV ===
Of Book IV the title and preface have been lost, so that the program has to be gathered from the book itself. At the beginning is the well-known generalization of Euclid I.47 (Pappus's area theorem), then follow various theorems on the circle, leading up to the problem of the construction of a circle which shall circumscribe three given circles, touching each other two and two. This and several other propositions on contact, e.g. cases of circles touching one another and inscribed in the figure made of three semicircles and known as arbelos ("shoemakers knife") form the first division of the book; Pappus turns then to a consideration of certain properties of Archimedes's spiral, the conchoid of Nicomedes (already mentioned in Book I as supplying a method of doubling the cube), and the curve discovered most probably by Hippias of Elis about 420 BC, and known by the name, τετραγωνισμός, or quadratrix. Proposition 30 describes the construction of a curve of double curvature called by Pappus the helix on a sphere; it is described by a point moving uniformly along the arc of a great circle, which itself turns about its diameter uniformly, the point describing a quadrant and the great circle a complete revolution in the same time. The area of the surface included between this curve and its base is found – the first known instance of a quadrature of a curved surface. The rest of the book treats of the trisection of an angle, and the solution of more general problems of the same kind by means of the quadratrix and spiral. In one solution of the former problem is the first recorded use of the property of a conic (a hyperbola) with reference to the focus and directrix.

=== Book V ===
In Book V, after an interesting preface concerning regular polygons, and containing remarks upon the hexagonal form of the cells of honeycombs, Pappus addresses himself to the comparison of the areas of different plane figures which have all the same perimeter (following Zenodorus's treatise on this subject), and of the volumes of different solid figures which have all the same superficial area, and, lastly, a comparison of the five regular solids of Plato. Incidentally Pappus describes the thirteen other polyhedra bounded by equilateral and equiangular but not similar polygons, discovered by Archimedes, and finds, by a method recalling that of Archimedes, the surface and volume of a sphere.

=== Book VI ===
According to the preface, Book VI is intended to resolve difficulties occurring in the so-called "Little Astronomy" (Ancient Greek: Μικρὸς Ἀστρονομούμενος), i.e. works other than the Almagest. It accordingly comments on the Sphaerica of Theodosius, the Moving Sphere of Autolycus, Theodosius's book on Day and Night, the treatise of Aristarchus On the Size and Distances of the Sun and Moon, and Euclid's Optics and Phaenomena.

=== Book VII ===
Since Michel Chasles cited this book of Pappus in his history of geometric methods, it has become the object of considerable attention.

The preface of Book VII explains the terms analysis and synthesis, and the distinction between theorem and problem. Pappus then enumerates works of Euclid, Apollonius, Aristaeus and Eratosthenes, thirty-three books in all, the substance of which he intends to give, with the lemmas necessary for their elucidation. With the mention of the Porisms of Euclid we have an account of the relation of porism to theorem and problem. In the same preface is included (a) the famous problem known by Pappus's name, often enunciated thus: Having given a number of straight lines, to find the geometric locus of a point such that the lengths of the perpendiculars upon, or (more generally) the lines drawn from it obliquely at given inclinations to, the given lines satisfy the condition that the product of certain of them may bear a constant ratio to the product of the remaining ones; (Pappus does not express it in this form but by means of composition of ratios, saying that if the ratio is given which is compounded of the ratios of pairs one of one set and one of another of the lines so drawn, and of the ratio of the odd one, if any, to a given straight line, the point will lie on a curve given in position); (b) the theorems which were rediscovered by and named after Paul Guldin, but appear to have been discovered by Pappus himself.

Book VII also contains

1. under the head of the De Sectione Determinata of Apollonius, lemmas which, closely examined, are seen to be cases of the involution of six points;
2. important lemmas on the Porisms of Euclid, including what is called Pappus's hexagon theorem;
3. a lemma upon the Surface Loci of Euclid which states that the locus of a point such that its distance from a given point bears a constant ratio to its distance from a given straight line is a conic, and is followed by proofs that the conic is a parabola, ellipse, or hyperbola according as the constant ratio is equal to, less than or greater than 1 (the first recorded proofs of the properties, which do not appear in Apollonius).

Chasles's citation of Pappus was repeated by Wilhelm Blaschke and Dirk Struik. In Cambridge, England, John J. Milne gave readers the benefit of his reading of Pappus. In 1985 Alexander Jones wrote his thesis at Brown University on the subject. A revised form of his translation and commentary was published by Springer-Verlag the following year. Jones succeeds in showing how Pappus manipulated the complete quadrangle, used the relation of projective harmonic conjugates, and displayed an awareness of cross-ratios of points and lines. Furthermore, the concept of pole and polar is revealed as a lemma in Book VII.

=== Book VIII ===
Book VIII principally treats mechanics, the properties of the center of gravity, and some mechanical powers. Interspersed are some propositions on pure geometry. Proposition 14 shows how to draw an ellipse through five given points, and Prop. 15 gives a simple construction for the axes of an ellipse when a pair of conjugate diameters are given.

== Legacy ==
Pappus's Collection was relatively unknown in medieval Europe, but exerted great influence on 17th-century mathematics after being translated to Latin by Federico Commandino. Diophantus's Arithmetica and Pappus's Collection were the two major sources of Viète's In artem analyticam isagoge (1591). The Pappus's problem and its generalization led Descartes to the development of analytic geometry. Fermat also developed his version of analytic geometry and his method of Maxima and Minima from Pappus's summaries of Apollonius's lost works Plane Loci and On Determinate Section. Other mathematicians influenced by Pappus were Pacioli, da Vinci, Kepler, van Roomen, Pascal, Newton, Bernoulli, Euler, Gauss, Gergonne, Steiner and Poncelet.

In How to Solve It, a 1945 book on problem solving, mathematician George Pólya credited Book VII's discussion of geometrical analysis and synthesis as a first attempt to define the field that would later be known as heuristics:

In the seventh book of his Collectiones, Pappus reports about a branch of study which he calls analyomenos. We can render this name in English as "Treasury of Analysis", or as "Art of Solving Problems", or even as "Heuristic"; the last term seems to be preferable here.

The "heuristics dictionary" in How to Solve It contains a lengthy entry on the contributions of Pappus. Pólya also credited the Greek mathematician with articulating the heuristic strategy of working backwards to solve a difficult problem, i.e., start at a point that supposes the condition of the problem has been satisfied in all its parts, and then work backwards to something known. Pólya pointed to the "short, somewhat enigmatic phrase of Pappus": Assume what is required to be done as already done. The popularity of How to Solve It revived interest in heuristics and in Pappus's legacy.

== See also ==
- Pappus's hexagon theorem
- Pappus's centroid theorem
- Pappus chain
- Pappus configuration
- Pappus graph
