= Federico Commandino =

Italian humanist and mathematician (1509–1575)

Federico Commandino (1509 – 5 September 1575) was an Italian humanist and mathematician.

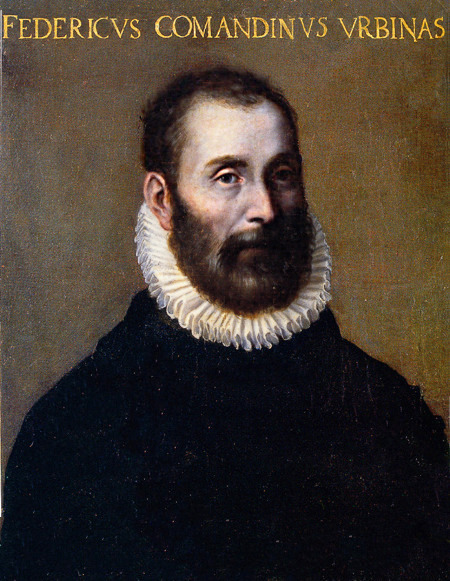
Federico Commandino

Born in Urbino, he studied at Padua and then at Ferrara, where he received his doctorate in medicine under Antonio Musa Brassavola. He had numerous patrons throughout his life. Initially, aided by Grassi, the bishop of Viterbo, he then came under the patronage of Pope Clement VIII. In Urbino, he was sponsored by Guidobaldo II della Rovere, but then came to Rome with cardinal Ranuccio Farnese. In Rome, he was patronized by Cardinal Cervini, who served briefly as Pope. Lured back to Urbino by Francesco Maria II della Rovere. In Urbino, he putatively met John Dee, and corresponded with the scholars Conrad Dasypodius (il Dasipodio), Gerolamo Cardano, Francesco Maurolico, and Christopher Clavius.

He was most famous for his central role as translator of works of ancient mathematicians. In this, his sources were primarily written in Greek and secondarily in Arabic, while his translations were primarily in Latin and secondarily in Italian. He was responsible for the publication of many treatises of Archimedes. He also translated the works of Aristarchus of Samos (On the sizes and distances of the Sun and the Moon), Pappus of Alexandria (Mathematical collection), Hero of Alexandria (Pneumatics), Ptolemy of Alexandria (Planisphere and Analemma), Apollonius of Perga (Conics) and Euclid of Alexandria (Elements). Among his pupils was Guidobaldo del Monte and Bernardino Baldi. Commandino maintained a correspondence with the astronomer Francesco Maurolico. The proposition known as Commandino's theorem first appears in his work on centers of gravity.

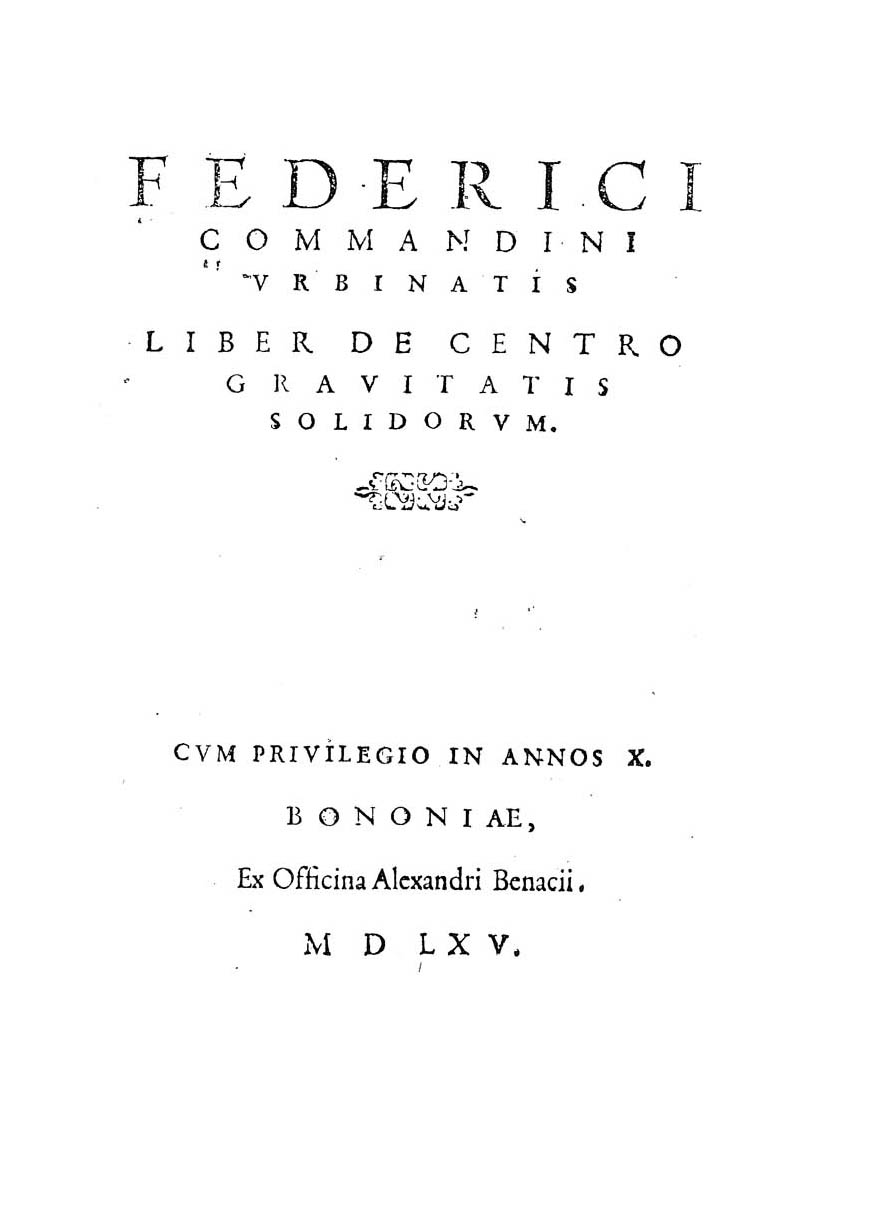
Liber de centro gravitatis solidorum, 1565

== Bibliography ==
- Archimedis De iis quae vehuntur in aqua libri duo/ a Frederico Commandino restituti et commentariis illustrati, Bononiae: Ex officina Alexandri Benacii (1565), 45 p.
