= Theodosius of Bithynia =

Ancient Greek astronomer and mathematician

Theodosius of Bithynia (Ancient Greek: Θεοδόσιος Theodosios; 2nd–1st century BC) was a Hellenistic astronomer and mathematician from Bithynia who wrote the Spherics, a treatise about spherical geometry, as well as several other books on mathematics and astronomy, of which two survive, On Habitations and On Days and Nights.

== Life ==
Little is known about Theodosius' life. The Suda (10th-century Byzantine encyclopedia) mentioned him writing a commentary on Archimedes' Method (late 3rd century BC), and Strabo's Geographica mentioned mathematicians Hipparchus (c. 190 – c. 120 BC) and "Theodosius and his sons" as among the residents of Bithynia distinguished for their learning. Vitruvius (1st century BC) mentioned a sundial invented by Theodosius. Thus, Theodosius lived sometime after Archimedes and before Vitruvius, likely contemporaneously with or after Hipparchus, probably sometime between 200 and 50 BC.

Historically, he was called Theodosius of Tripolis due to a confusing paragraph in the Suda which probably fused the entries about separate people named Theodosius, and was interpreted to mean that he came either from the Tripolis in Phoenicia or the one in Africa. Some sources claim he moved from Bithynia to Tripolis, or that he came from a hypothetical city called Tripolis in Bithynia.

== Works ==
Theodosius' chief work, the Spherics (Ancient Greek: τὰ σφαιρικά tá sphairiká), about spherical geometry, establishes a formal foundation for the mathematics of Greek spherical astronomy similar to the foundation Euclid's Elements provides for geometry in general. Euclid's Phenomena and Autolycus's On the Moving Sphere, both dating from two centuries prior, make use of geometric relationships proven in Spherics, so it has been speculated that they may have expected readers to be familiar with a treatise on elementary spherical geometry, perhaps by Eudoxus of Cnidus (4th century BC), on which the Spherics may have been based. However, no mention of this hypothetical earlier work or its author remains today, and it is also plausible that Theodosius was the first to formalize material that had been previously justified by informal physical demonstrations on a globe or armillary sphere.

In addition to the Spherics, two other works by Theodosius have survived: On Habitations, describing the appearances of the heavens at different climes and different times of the year, and On Days and Nights, a study of the apparent motion of the Sun.

Theodosius was cited by Vitruvius as having invented a sundial suitable for any place on Earth, but nothing else is known about it.

== Transmission and influence ==
All three of Theodosius' extant treatises were transmitted together as part of a collection now called the Little Astronomy, an assortment of shorter works on geometry and astronomy that build on Euclid's Elements. During the Islamic Golden Age, the books in the Little Astronomy were translated into Arabic, and with the addition of a few new works, were known as the Middle Books, intended to fit between the Elements and Ptolemy's Almagest. Spherics was translated into Arabic by Qusṭā ibn Lūqā and Thābit ibn Qurra, and translated from Arabic into Latin in the 12th century by Plato Tiburtinus and Gerard of Cremona. Theodosius' works were published in Latin in the 16th century.

The Spherics was widely copied and highly influential, serving as a theoretical foundation for spherical geometry and astronomy for millennia. Menelaus of Alexandria (c. 100 AD) extended it with his own Spherics, which proved many additional theorems of spherical geometry. Pappus of Alexandria (4th century) commented extensively on Theodosius' Spherics and On Days and Nights in his Collection, Book VI. Spherics was copied and studied in Greek manuscripts throughout the Byzantine period and became a foundational text for medieval Islamic and European astronomy from the 12th century onward.
