= Euclid's Data =

Geometry treatise

Data (Greek: Δεδομένα, Dedomena) is a work by Euclid. It deals with the nature and implications of "given" information in geometrical problems. The subject matter is closely related to the first four books of Euclid's Elements. The book contains 15 definitions and 94 propositions.

== Editions and translations ==
Greek text

- Data, ed. H. Menge, in Euclidis opera omnia, vol. 6, Leipzig: Teubner, 1896 (Google Books, Wilbour Hall)

English versions

- Translated by Robert Simson: 1821 edition, 1838 edition
- The Data of Euclid, trans. from the text of Menge by George L. McDowell and Merle A. Sokolik, Baltimore: Union Square Press, 1993 (ISBN 0-9635924-1-6)
- The Medieval Latin Translation of the Data of Euclid, translated by Shuntaro Ito, Tokyo University Press, 1980 and Birkhauser, 1998. (ISBN 3-7643-3005-8)
