= Menelaus of Alexandria =

Greek mathematician and astronomer (fl. 100)

Menelaus of Alexandria (/ˌmɛnɪˈleɪəs/; Ancient Greek: Μενέλαος ὁ Ἀλεξανδρεύς, Menelaos ho Alexandreus; fl. 100 CE) was a Greek mathematician and astronomer, the first to recognize geodesics on a curved surface as natural analogs of straight lines.

== Life and works ==
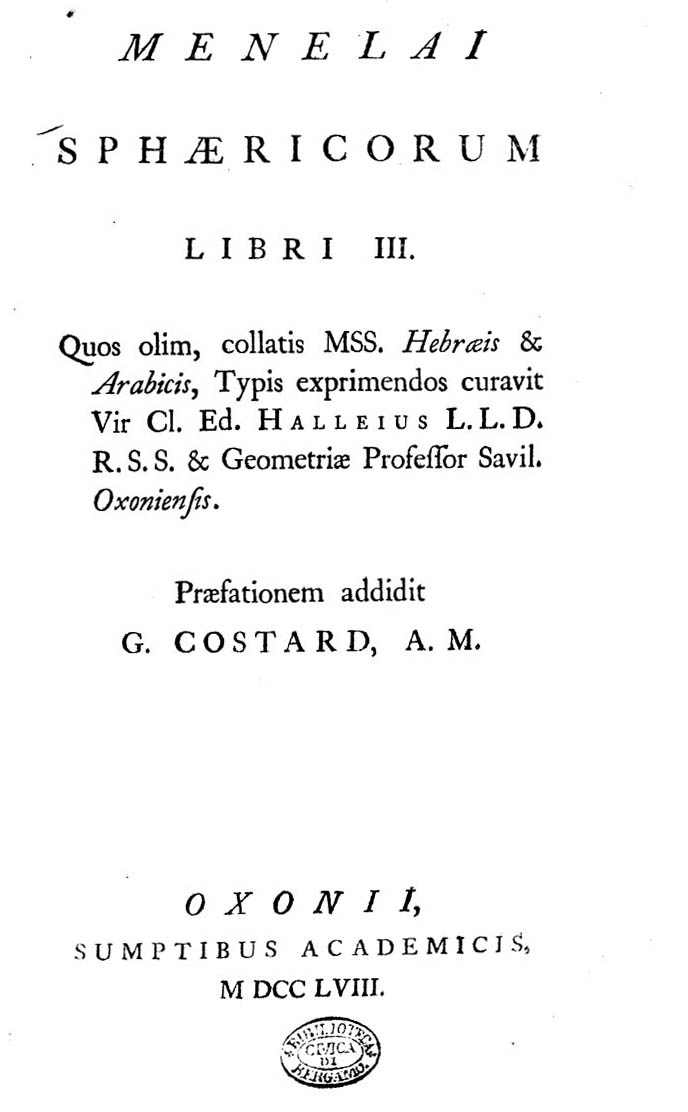
Sphaericorum libri tres

Although very little is known about Menelaus's life, it is supposed that he lived in Rome, where he probably moved after having spent his youth in Alexandria. He was called Menelaus of Alexandria by both Pappus of Alexandria and Proclus, and a conversation of his with Lucius, held in Rome, is recorded by Plutarch.

Ptolemy (2nd century CE) also mentions, in his work Almagest (VII.3), two astronomical observations made by Menelaus in Rome in January of the year 98. These were occultations of the stars Spica and Beta Scorpii by the moon, a few nights apart. Ptolemy used these observations to confirm precession of the equinoxes, a phenomenon that had been discovered by Hipparchus in the 2nd century BCE.

In the 10th-century Kitāb al-Fihrist [The Book Catalogue] by Ibn al-Nadīm, six books by Menelaus are mentioned: the Book of Spherical Propositions (Sphaerica), On the Knowledge of the Weights and Distribution of Different Bodies, The Elements of Geometry in three books, and The Book on the Triangle. Only the first of these, Sphaerica, survives today in Arabic translation. Composed of three books, it deals with the geometry of the sphere and its application in astronomical measurements and calculations. The book introduces the concept of spherical triangle (figures formed of three great circle arcs, which he named "trilaterals") and proves Menelaus' theorem on collinearity of points on the edges of a triangle (which may have been previously known) and its analog for spherical triangles. It was later translated by the sixteenth century astronomer and mathematician Francesco Maurolico.

The lunar crater Menelaus is named after him.

== Bibliography ==
The titles of a few books by Menelaus have been preserved:

- On the calculation of the chords in a circle, composed of six books
- Elements of geometry, composed of three books, later edited by Thabit ibn Qurra
- On the knowledge of the weights and distributions of different bodies
- He may also have written a star catalogue.
