= Aristarchus's inequality =

Inequality of acute angles and their trigonometric ratios

Aristarchus's inequality (after the Greek astronomer and mathematician Aristarchus of Samos; c. 310 – c. 230 BCE) is a law of trigonometry which states that if α and β are acute angles (i.e. between 0 and a right angle) and β < α then

$$\frac{\sin\alpha}{\sin\beta} < \frac{\alpha}{\beta} < \frac{\tan\alpha}{\tan\beta}.$$

Ptolemy used the first of these inequalities while constructing his table of chords.

== Proof ==
The proof is a consequence of the more widely known inequalities

$$0<\sin(\alpha)<\alpha<\tan(\alpha)$$,

$0<\sin(\beta)<\sin(\alpha)<1$ and

$$1>\cos(\beta)>\cos(\alpha)>0$$.

=== Proof of the first inequality ===
Using these inequalities we can first prove that

$$\frac{\sin(\alpha)}{\sin(\beta)} < \frac{\alpha}{\beta}.$$

We first note that the inequality is equivalent to

$$\frac{\sin(\alpha)}{\alpha} < \frac{\sin(\beta)}{\beta}$$

which itself can be rewritten as

$$\frac{\sin(\alpha)-\sin(\beta)}{\alpha-\beta} < \frac{\sin(\beta)}{\beta}.$$

We now want to show that

$$\frac{\sin(\alpha)-\sin(\beta)}{\alpha-\beta}<\cos(\beta) < \frac{\sin(\beta)}{\beta}.$$

The second inequality is simply $\beta<\tan\beta$. The first one is true because

$$\frac{\sin(\alpha)-\sin(\beta)}{\alpha-\beta}
= \frac{2\cdot\sin\left(\frac{\alpha-\beta}2
\right)\cos\left(\frac{\alpha+\beta}2\right)}{\alpha-\beta}
< \frac{2\cdot \left(\frac{\alpha-\beta}2
\right) \cdot \cos(\beta)}{\alpha-\beta}
= \cos(\beta).$$

=== Proof of the second inequality ===
Now we want to show the second inequality, i.e. that:

$$\frac{\alpha}{\beta} <\frac{\tan(\alpha)}{\tan(\beta)}.$$

We first note that due to the initial inequalities we have that:

$$\beta<\tan(\beta)=\frac{\sin(\beta)}{\cos(\beta)}<\frac{\sin(\beta)}{\cos(\alpha)}$$

Consequently, using that $0<\alpha-\beta<\alpha$ in the previous equation (replacing $\beta$ by $\alpha-\beta<\alpha$) we obtain:

$${\alpha-\beta}<{\frac{\sin(\alpha-\beta)}{\cos(\alpha)}}=\tan(\alpha)\cos(\beta)-\sin(\beta).$$

We conclude that

$$\frac{\alpha}{\beta}=\frac{\alpha-\beta}{\beta}+1< \frac{\tan(\alpha)\cos(\beta)-\sin(\beta)}{\sin(\beta)}+1 = \frac{\tan(\alpha)}{\tan(\beta)}.$$

== See also ==
- Aristarchus of Samos
- Eratosthenes
- Posidonius
