= On Sizes and Distances =

On (the) Sizes and Distances (of the Sun and Moon) may refer to:

- On the Sizes and Distances (Aristarchus), by Aristarchus of Samos (c. 310 – c. 230 BC)
- On Sizes and Distances (Hipparchus), by Hipparchus (c. 190 – c. 120 BC)
