= On Sizes and Distances (Hipparchus) =

Treatise by Ancient Greek astronomer Hipparchus

On Sizes and Distances (of the Sun and Moon) (Greek: Περὶ μεγεθῶν καὶ ἀποστημάτων [ἡλίου καὶ σελήνης], romanized: Peri megethon kai apostematon) is a text by the ancient Greek astronomer Hipparchus (c. 190 – c. 120 BC) in which approximations are made for the radii of the Sun and the Moon as well as their distances from the Earth. It is not extant, but some of its contents have been preserved in the works of Ptolemy and his commentator Pappus of Alexandria. Several modern historians have attempted to reconstruct the methods of Hipparchus using the available texts.

== Sources ==
Most of what is known about Hipparchus' text comes from two ancient sources: Ptolemy and Pappus. The work is also mentioned by Theon of Smyrna and others, but their accounts have proven less useful in reconstructing the procedures of Hipparchus.

=== Ptolemy ===
In Almagest V, 11, Ptolemy writes:

Now Hipparchus made such an examination principally from the sun. Since from other properties of the sun and moon (of which a study will be made below) it follows that if the distance of one of the two luminaries is given, the distance of the other is also given, he tries by conjecturing the distance of the sun to demonstrate the distance of the moon. First, he assumes the sun to show the least perceptible parallax to find its distance. After this, he makes use of the solar eclipse adduced by him, first as if the sun shows no perceptible parallax, and for exactly that reason the ratios of the moon's distances appeared different to him for each of the hypotheses he set out. But with respect to the sun, not only the amount of its parallax, but also whether it shows any parallax at all is altogether doubtful.

This passage gives a general outline of what Hipparchus did, but provides no details. Ptolemy clearly did not agree with the methods employed by Hipparchus, and thus did not go into any detail.

=== Pappus of Alexandria ===
The works of Hipparchus were still extant when Pappus wrote his commentary on the Almagest in the 4th century. He fills in some of the details that Ptolemy omits:

Now, Hipparchus made such an examination principally from the sun, and not accurately. For since the moon in the syzygies and near greatest distance appears equal to the sun, and since the size of the diameters of the sun and moon is given (of which a study will be made below), it follows that if the distance of one of the two luminaries is given, the distance of the other is also given, as in Theorem 12, if the distance of the moon is given and the diameters of the sun and moon, the distance of the sun is given. Hipparchus tries by conjecturing the parallax and the distance of the sun to demonstrate the distance of the moon, but with respect to the sun, not only the amount of its parallax, but also whether it shows any parallax at all is altogether doubtful. For in this way Hipparchus was in doubt about the sun, not only about the amount of its parallax but also about whether it shows any parallax at all. In the first book "On Sizes and Distances" it is assumed that the earth has the ratio of a point and center to the sun. And by means of the eclipse adduced by him...

Then later,

For in Book 1 of "On Sizes and Distances" he takes the following observation: an eclipse of the sun, which in the regions around the Hellespont was an exact eclipse of the whole solar disc, such that no part of it was visible, but at Alexandria by Egypt approximately four-fifths of it was eclipsed. By means of this he shows in Book 1 that, in units of which the radius of the earth is one, the least distance of the moon is 71, and the greatest 83. Hence the mean is 77... Then again he himself in Book 2 of "On Sizes and Distances" shows from many considerations that, in units of which the radius of the earth is one, the least distance of the moon is 62, and the mean 67 1/3, and the distance of the sun 490. It is clear that the greatest distance of the moon is 72 2/3.

This passage provides enough details to make a reconstruction feasible. In particular, it makes clear that there were two separate procedures, and it gives the precise results of each. It provides clues with which to identify the eclipse, and says that Hipparchus used a formula "as in Theorem 12," a theorem of Ptolemy's which is extant.

== Modern reconstructions ==
Several historians of science have attempted to reconstruct the calculations involved in On Sizes and Distances. The first attempt was made by Friedrich Hultsch in 1900, but it was later rejected by Noel Swerdlow in 1969. G. J. Toomer expanded on his efforts in 1974.

=== Hultsch ===
Friedrich Hultsch determined in a 1900 paper that the Pappus source had been miscopied, and that the actual distance to the Sun, as calculated by Hipparchus, had been 2490 Earth radii (not 490). As in English, there is only a single character difference between these two results in Greek.

His analysis was based on a text by Theon of Smyrna which states that Hipparchus found the Sun to be 1880 times the size of the Earth, and the Earth 27 times the size of the Moon. Assuming that this refers to volumes, it follows that

$$s = \sqrt[3]{1880} \approx 12+1/3$$

and

$$\ell = \sqrt[3]{1/27} = 1/3$$

Assuming that the Sun and Moon have the same apparent size in the sky, and that the Moon is 67 1/3 Earth radii distant, it follows that

$$S = \frac{s}{\ell} L \approx \frac{12+1/3}{1/3} (67+1/3) = 2491 + 1/3 \approx 2490$$

This result was generally accepted for the next seventy years, until Noel Swerdlow reinvestigated the case.

=== Book 2 reconstruction (Swerdlow) ===

Swerdlow determined that Hipparchus relates the distances to the Sun and Moon using a construction found in Ptolemy. It would not be surprising if this calculation had been originally developed by Hipparchus himself, as he was a primary source for the Almagest.

Using this calculation, Swerdlow was able to relate the two results of Hipparchus (67 1/3 for the Moon and 490 for the Sun). Obtaining this relationship exactly requires following a very precise set of approximations.

Using simple trigonometric identities gives

$$\ell = L \tan \theta \approx L \sin \theta$$

and

$$h = \frac{\tan \varphi}{\tan \theta} \ell \approx \frac{\varphi}{\theta} \ell \approx \frac{\varphi}{\theta} L \sin \theta$$

By parallel lines and taking t = 1, we get

$$\ell + x = t + (t-h) = 2t-h  \Rightarrow  x\approx 2 - \left(\frac{\varphi}{\theta}+1\right) L \sin \theta$$

By similarity of triangles,

$$\frac{t}{x} = \frac{S}{S-L} \Rightarrow S = \frac{L}{1-x}$$

Combining these equations gives

$$S
\approx \frac{L}{\left(\frac{\varphi}{\theta}+1\right) L \sin \theta - 1}
= 1 \left/ \left( \left( \frac{\varphi}{\theta} + 1 \right) \sin \theta - \frac{1}{L} \right) \right.$$

The values which Hipparchus took for these variables can be found in Ptolemy's Almagest IV, 9. He says Hipparchus found that the Moon measured its own circle close to 650 times, and that the angular diameter of Earth's shadow is 2.5 times that of the Moon. Pappus tells us that Hipparchus took the mean distance to the Moon to be 67 1/3. This gives:

Quantity	Value
$2\theta$	$360^\circ /650 = 0.554^\circ$
$\varphi$	$2.5 \theta = 0.6925^\circ$
$L$	67 1/3

According to Swerdlow, Hipparchus now evaluated this expression with the following roundings (the values are in sexagesimal):

$$\ell \approx L \sin \theta \approx 0;19,30$$

and

$$h \approx \frac{\varphi}{\theta} \ell \approx 0;48,45$$

Then, because

$$\ell + h
\approx \frac{\varphi}{\theta} L \sin \theta + L \sin \theta
= \left(\frac{\varphi}{\theta}+1\right) L \sin \theta$$

it follows that

$$S \approx L/(\ell + h - 1) \approx 67;20 / 0;8,15 \approx 489.70 \approx 490$$

Swerdlow used this result to argue that 490 was the correct reading of the Pappus text, thus invalidating Hultsch' interpretation. While this result is highly dependent on the particular approximations and roundings used, it has generally been accepted. It leaves open, however, the question of where the lunar distance 67 1/3 came from.

Following Pappus and Ptolemy, Swerdlow suggested that Hipparchus had estimated 490 Earth radii as a minimum possible distance to the Sun. This distance corresponds to a solar parallax of 7', which may have been the maximum that he thought would have gone unnoticed (the typical resolution of the human eye is 2'). The formula obtained above for the distance to the Sun can be inverted to determine the distance to the Moon:

$$L
\approx \frac{S}{\left(\frac{\varphi}{\theta}+1\right) S \sin \theta - 1}
= 1 \left/ \left( \left( \frac{\varphi}{\theta} + 1 \right) \sin \theta - \frac{1}{S} \right) \right.$$

Using the same values as above for each angle, and using 490 Earth radii as the minimum solar distance, it follows that the maximum mean lunar distance is

$$L \approx 1 \left/ \left( ( 2.5 + 1 ) \sin 0.277^\circ - \frac{1}{490} \right) \right.
\approx 67.203 \approx 67\tfrac{1}{3}$$

Toomer expanded on this by observing that as the distance to the Sun increases without bound, the formula approaches a minimum mean lunar distance:

$$L \approx 1 \left/\left( (2.5 + 1) \sin 0.277^\circ \right)\right. \approx 59.10$$

This is close to the value later claimed by Ptolemy.

=== Book 1 reconstruction (Toomer) ===
In addition to explaining the minimum lunar distance that Hipparchus achieved, Toomer was able to explain the method of the first book, which employed a solar eclipse. Pappus states that this eclipse was total in the region of the Hellespont, but was observed to be 4/5 of total in Alexandria.

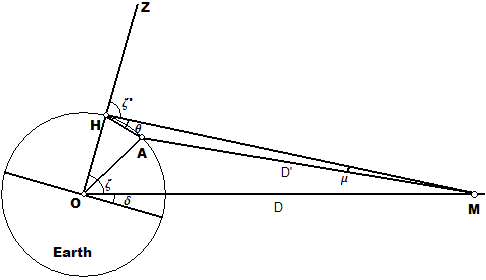

If Hipparchus assumed that the Sun was infinitely distant (i.e. that "the earth has the ratio of a point and center to the sun"), then the difference in magnitude of the solar eclipse must be due entirely to the parallax of the Moon. By using observational data, he would be able to determine this parallax, and hence the distance of the Moon.

Hipparchus would have known $\varphi_A$ and $\varphi_H$, the latitudes of Alexandria and the Hellespontine region, respectively. He also would have known $\delta$, the declination of the Moon during the eclipse, and $\mu$, which is related to the difference in totality of the eclipse between the two regions.

$$AH = \frac{t\operatorname{Crd} \angle AOH}{R} = \frac{t\operatorname{Crd}(\varphi_H - \varphi_A)}{R}$$

Crd here refers to the chord function, which maps an angle in degrees to the corresponding length of a chord of a circle of unit diameter. Also, R is the radius of the base circle that Hipparchus used to compute the chord function and t is the radius of the Earth. Since the Moon is very distant, it follows that $\zeta' \approx \zeta$. Using this approximation gives

$$\zeta = \varphi_H - \delta$$
$$\angle ZHA = 180^\circ - \angle OHA$$
$$\angle OHA = \frac{180^\circ - \angle AOH}{2} = \frac{180^\circ - (\varphi_H - \varphi_A)}{2}$$

Hence,

$$\angle ZHA = 90^\circ + \frac{1}{2} (\varphi_H - \varphi_A)$$
$$\angle MHA = \theta = \angle ZHA - \zeta' \approx \angle ZHA - \zeta = 90^\circ - \frac{1}{2} (\varphi_H + \varphi_A) + \delta$$

With $AH$ and $\theta$, we only need $\mu$ to get $D'$. Because the eclipse was total at H, and 4/5 total at A, it follows that $\mu$ is 1/5 of the apparent diameter of the Sun. This quantity was well known by Hipparchus—he took it to be 1/650 of a full circle. The distance from the center of the Earth to the Moon then follows from $D \approx D' + t$.

Toomer determined how Hipparchus determined the chord for small angles (see Chord (geometry)). His values for the latitudes of the Hellespont (41 degrees) and Alexandria (31 degrees) are known from Strabo's work on Geography. To determine the declination, it is necessary to know which eclipse Hipparchus used.

Because he knew the value which Hipparchus eventually gave for the distance to the Moon (71 Earth radii) and the rough region of the eclipse, Toomer was able to determine that Hipparchus used the solar eclipse of March 14, 190 BC. This eclipse fits all the mathematical parameters very well, and also makes sense from a historical point of view. The eclipse was total in Nicaea, Hipparchus' birthplace, so he may have heard stories of it. There is also an account of it in Strabo's Ab Urbe Condita VIII.2. The declination of the Moon at this time was $\delta = -3^\circ$. Hence, using chord trigonometry, gives

$$\theta = 54^\circ + \delta$$
$$AH = \frac{t\operatorname{Crd} 10^\circ}{R} \approx t\ \frac{600}{3438}$$
$$\mu = \frac{360 \cdot 60}{5 \cdot 650}$$
$$D' = \frac{\operatorname{Crd} 2 \theta \cdot AH}{\operatorname{Crd} \mu \cdot 2}
= \frac{\operatorname{Crd} (108^\circ + 2 \delta) \cdot 600 \cdot 5 \cdot 650}{21600 \cdot 2 \cdot 3438} t$$

Now using Hipparchus' chord tables,

$$\operatorname{Crd} (108^\circ + 2 (-3^\circ)) = \operatorname{Crd} 102^\circ \approx 2 \cdot 3438 \sin 51^\circ \approx 5340$$

and hence

$$D' = \frac{5340 \cdot 600 \cdot 5 \cdot 650}{21600 \cdot 2 \cdot 3438} t \approx 70.1 t \Rightarrow D \approx D' + t \approx 71.1 t$$

This agrees well with the value of 71 Earth radii that Pappus reports.

== Conclusion ==
Assuming that these reconstructions accurately reflect what Hipparchus wrote in On Sizes and Distances, then this work was a remarkable accomplishment. This approach of setting limits on an unknown physical quantity was not new to Hipparchus (see Aristarchus of Samos. Archimedes also did the same with pi), but in those cases, the bounds reflected the inability to determine a mathematical constant to an arbitrary precision, not uncertainty in physical observations.

Hipparchus appears to have eventually resolved the contradiction between his two results. His aim in calculating the distance to the Moon was to obtain an accurate value for the lunar parallax, so that he might predict eclipses with more precision. To this, he had to settle on a particular value for the distance/parallax, not a range of values.

There is some evidence that he did this. Combining the calculations of Book 2 and the account of Theon of Smyrna yields a lunar distance of 60.5 Earth radii. Doing the same with the account of Cleomedes yields a distance of 61 Earth radii. These are remarkably close to both Ptolemy's value and the modern one.

According to Toomer,

This procedure, if I have constructed it correctly, is very remarkable... What is astonishing is the sophistication of approaching the problem by two quite different methods, and also the complete honesty with which Hipparchus reveals his discrepant results... which are nevertheless of the same order of magnitude and (for the first time in the history of astronomy) in the right region.

== See also ==
- Aristarchus of Samos (c. 310 – c. 230 BC), a Greek mathematician who calculated the distance from the Earth to the Sun.
- Axial precession
- Eratosthenes (c. 276 – c. 194/195 BC), a Greek mathematician who calculated the circumference of the Earth and also the distance from the Earth to the Sun.
- Greek mathematics
- Hipparchus (c. 190 – c. 120 BC)
- Posidonius (c. 135 – c. 51 BC), a Greek astronomer and mathematician who calculated the circumference of the Earth.
