= Asger Aaboe =

Danish historian (1922–2007)

- Born: Asger Hartvig Aaboe; April 26, 1922
- Died: January 19, 2007 (aged 84)
- Education: University of Copenhagen; Brown University; Yale University

Asger Hartvig Aaboe (26 April 1922 – 19 January 2007) was a Danish historian of the exact sciences and mathematics who was best known for his contributions to the history of ancient Babylonian astronomy. In his studies of Babylonian astronomy, he went beyond analyses in terms of modern mathematics to seek to understand how the Babylonians conceived their computational schemes.

== Education and career ==
Aaboe studied mathematics and astronomy at the University of Copenhagen, and in 1957 obtained a PhD in the History of Science from Brown University, where he studied under Otto Neugebauer, writing a dissertation "On Babylonian Planetary Theories". In 1961, he joined the Department of the History of Science and Medicine at Yale University, serving as chair from 1968 to 1971, and continuing an active career there until retiring in 1992. At Yale, his doctoral students included Alice Slotsky and Noel Swerdlow.

Aaboe was elected to the Royal Danish Academy of Sciences and Letters in 1975 and was a member of the International Academy of the History of Science. He served as president of the Connecticut Academy of Arts and Sciences from 1970 to 1980, and was a member of many other scholarly societies.

In 1987, a festschrift was published in honor of Asger Aaboe's 65th birthday.

== Personal life ==
Aaboe married Joan Armstrong on 14 July 1950. The marriage produced four children: Kirsten Aaboe, Erik Harris Aaboe, Anne Aaboe, Niels Peter Aaboe. Joan died in 1990, and Aaobe remarried Izabela Zbikowska in 2006.

== Selected publications ==
- Episodes from the Early History of Mathematics, New York: Random House, 1964. LCCN 63-21916
  - Episodes From The Early History Of Mathematics. New Mathematical Library. Vol. 13. Washington, DC: Mathematical Association of America. 1998 [1st pub. 1963]. ISBN 0-88385-613-1.
- "Scientific Astronomy in Antiquity", Philosophical Transactions of the Royal Society of London, A.276, (1974: 21–42). doi:10.1098/rsta.1974.0007
- "Mesopotamian Mathematics, Astronomy, and Astrology", The Cambridge Ancient History (2nd. ed.), Vol. III, part 2, chap. 28b, Cambridge: Cambridge University Press, 1991, ISBN 978-0-521-22717-9; chapter summary
- Episodes from the Early History of Astronomy, New York: Springer, 2001, ISBN 0-387-95136-9, LCCN 00-61919
  - Aaboe, Asger (27 June 2011). 2011 pbk edition. Springer. ISBN 978-1-461-30109-7.
