= Noel Swerdlow =

American historian (1941–2021)

Noel Mark Swerdlow
- Born: 9 September 1941
- Died: 24 July 2021 (aged 79)
- Education: Yale University, 1968
- Awards: MacArthur Foundation Fellowship
- Scientific career
- Fields: History of science, history of astronomy
- Workplaces: University of Chicago
- Thesis: Ptolemy's Theory of the Distances and Sizes of the Planets: A Study of The Scientific Foundations of Medieval Cosmology (1968)
- Doctoral advisor: Asger Aaboe

Noel Mark Swerdlow (9 September 1941 – 24 July 2021) was a professor emeritus of history, astronomy and astrophysics at the University of Chicago. He was a visiting professor at the California Institute of Technology.

== Career ==
Swerdlow specialized in the history of exact sciences, astronomy in particular, from antiquity through the 17th century. He earned his Ph.D. at Yale University in 1968; his doctoral dissertation, Ptolemy's Theory of the Distances and Sizes of the Planets: A Study of The Scientific Foundations of Medieval Cosmology, was supervised by Asger Aaboe.

== Publications ==
The Derivation and First Draft of Copernicus's Planetary Theory: A Translation of the Commentariolus with Commentary by Noel M. Swerdlow in the Proceedings of the American Philosophical Society Vol. 117, No. 6, Symposium on Copernicus (Dec. 31, 1973), pp. 423–512 (90 pages)

In 1984, Swerdlow, with co-author Otto E. Neugebauer, published Mathematical Astronomy in Copernicus’ De Revolutionibus, Springer. ISBN 978-1-4613-8262-1 a two volume investigation of the sources and methods of that pivotal work in the development of astronomy that first laid out a heliocentric theory of the Solar System.

The Babylonian Theory of the Planets by N. M. Swerdlow | Princeton University Press | 1998 | ISBN 9780691605500

Otto E. Neugebauer 1899–1990 A Biographical Memoir by N. M. Swerdlow published by the National Academies Press for the National Academy of Sciences | 1998

An essay on Thomas Kuhn's First Scientific Revolution, "The Copernican Revolution" in the Proceedings of the American Philosophical Society Vol. 148, No. 1, March 2004 (pp. 64–120)

In 1988 Swerdlow received the MacArthur Foundation Fellowship, often referred to as the "genius grant." In the same year he published the book The Babylonian Theory of the Planets (Princeton University Press).

In 1988 he was also elected to membership in the American Philosophical Society, the oldest learned society in the United States, dating to 1743.

== See also ==
- On Sizes and Distances (Hipparchus)
