= Alice Slotsky =

American historian of mathematics

Alice Louise Slotsky (née Weisfeld) was an American historian of mathematics and Assyriologist known for her studies of Babylonian mathematics and Babylonian accounting and for her popular courses at Brown University on the Akkadian language.

== Education and career ==
Slotsky did her undergraduate studies at Bryn Mawr College, majoring in economics, and continued as a graduate student of economics at New York University. In 1959, she married Gordon J. Slotsky, who became a statistician in the aerospace industry. Many years later, she returned to graduate study in the history of mathematics at Yale University, where she completed a Ph.D. in 1992 under the supervision of Asger Aaboe.

Slotsky became a visiting associate professor in the department of history of mathematics at Brown University, led by David Pingree, where she taught the Akkadian language beginning in 1999. Her course became "wildly popular", and through it she taught "more students than any previous Assyriologist". However, when Pingree died in 2005, the university shut down the department and shunted Slotsky off to an interim position in the classics department, where she taught for only two more years, before the Akkadian class was removed from that department as well.

She died on June 13, 2023, in Providence, Rhode Island.

== Books ==
Slotsky's 1992 doctoral dissertation became a 1997 book by the same title, The Bourse of Babylon: market quotations in the astronomical diaries of Babylonia (CDL Press). With Ronald Wallenfels, she also published a second book, Tallies and Trends: The Late Babylonian Commodity Price Lists (CDL Press, 2009).

With Sarah C. Melville, she edited Opening the Tablet Box: Near Eastern Studies in Honor of Benjamin R. Foster (Brill, 2010).

== Recognition ==
A festschrift in Slotsky's honor, From the Banks of the Euphrates: Studies in Honor of Alice Louise Slotsky, was edited by Micah Ross and published by Eisenbrauns in 2008.
