= Aristarchus of Samos =

Greek astronomer and mathematician (c. 310 – 230 BC)

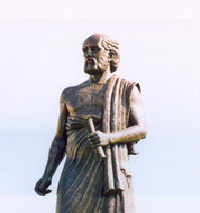
- Statue of Aristarchus of Samos at the Aristotle University of Thessaloniki
- Born: c. 310 BC; Samos
- Died: c. 230 BC; Alexandria, Ptolemaic Kingdom
- Occupations: Scholar; Mathematician; Astronomer

Aristarchus of Samos (/ˌærɪˈstɑːrkəs/; Ancient Greek: Ἀρίσταρχος ὁ Σάμιος, Aristarkhos ho Samios; c. 310 – c. 230 BC) was an ancient Greek astronomer and mathematician who presented the first known heliocentric model that placed the Sun at the center of the universe, with the Earth revolving around the Sun once a year and rotating about its axis once a day. He also supported the theory of Anaxagoras that the Sun was just another star.

Born in Samos in approximately 310 BC, Aristarchus likely moved to Alexandria and became a student of Strato of Lampsacus, who later became the head of the Peripatetic school in Greece. According to Ptolemy, Aristarchus observed the summer solstice of 280 BC. Vitruvius writes that Aristarchus built two different sundials: one a flat disc; and one hemispherical. Aristarchus estimated the sizes of the Sun and Moon as compared to Earth, and the distances from the Earth to the Sun and to the Moon. His estimate that the Sun was 7 times larger than Earth (it's actually 109 times, in diameter) brought about the further insight that the Sun's greater size made it the most natural central point of the universe, as opposed to Earth.

Aristarchus was influenced by the concept presented by Philolaus of Croton (c. 470 – 385 BC) of a fire at the center of the universe (i.e. by contemporary understanding, at the center of the Earth). Aristarchus recast this "central fire" as the Sun, and he arranged the other planets in their correct order of distance around the Sun.

Like Anaxagoras before him, Aristarchus suspected that the stars were just other bodies like the Sun, albeit farther away from Earth. His astronomical ideas were often rejected in favor of the geocentric theories of Aristotle and Ptolemy. Nicolaus Copernicus knew that Aristarchus had a 'moving Earth' theory, although it is unlikely that Copernicus was aware that it was a heliocentric theory. (Note: The Greek mathematician and astronomer Aristarchus of Samos proposed such a system during the third century BC (Dreyer 1953, pp. 135–48). In an early unpublished manuscript of De Revolutionibus (which still survives in the Jagiellonian Library in Kraków), Copernicus wrote that "It is credible that... Philolaus believed in the mobility of the Earth and some even say that Aristarchus was of that opinion", a passage that was removed from the published edition, a decision described by Owen Gingerich as "eminently sensible" "from an editorial viewpoint". Philolaus was not a heliocentrist, as he thought that both the Earth and the Sun moved around a central fire. Gingerich says that there is no evidence that Copernicus was aware of the few clear references to Aristarchus's heliocentrism in ancient texts (as distinct from one other unclear and confusing one), especially Archimedes's The Sand-Reckoner (which did not appear in print until the year after Copernicus died), and that it would have been in his interest to mention them had he known of them, before concluding that he developed his idea and its justification independently of Aristarchus.)

== Heliocentrism ==
The original text has been lost, but a reference in a book by Archimedes, entitled The Sand Reckoner (Archimedis Syracusani Arenarius & Dimensio Circuli), describes a work in which Aristarchus advanced the heliocentric model as an alternative hypothesis to geocentrism:

You are aware ['you' being King Gelon] that "universe" is the name given by most astronomers to the sphere, the centre of which is the centre of the earth, while its radius is equal to the straight line between the centre of the sun and the centre of the earth. This is the common account (τὰ γραφόμενα), as you have heard from astronomers. But Aristarchus brought out a book consisting of certain hypotheses, wherein it appears, as a consequence of the assumptions made, that the universe is many times greater than the "universe" just mentioned. His hypotheses are that the fixed stars and the sun remain unmoved, that the earth revolves about the sun in the circumference of a circle, the sun lying in the middle of the orbit, and that the sphere of the fixed stars, situated about the same centre as the sun, is so great that the circle in which he supposes the earth to revolve bears such a proportion to the distance of the fixed stars as the centre of the sphere bears to its surface.

Aristarchus proposed that the fixed stars were extremely distant, and because ancient cosmology placed them all on a single celestial sphere, the modern concept of stellar parallax did not apply to his model. He placed the stars at a great distance so that their apparent positions relative to each other would remain constant throughout Earth's motion. Aristarchus reconciled this issue by postulating that the stars were other suns that are very far away, far enough that the parallax was not observable. This implied a universe much larger than had been believed.

It is a common misconception that the heliocentric view was considered sacrilegious by the contemporaries of Aristarchus. Lucio Russo traces this to Gilles Ménage's printing of a passage from Plutarch's On the Apparent Face in the Orb of the Moon, in which Aristarchus jokes with Cleanthes, who is head of the Stoics, a sun worshipper, and opposed to heliocentrism. In the manuscript of Plutarch's text, Aristarchus says Cleanthes should be charged with impiety. Ménage's version, published shortly after the trials of Galileo and Giordano Bruno, transposes an accusative and nominative so that it is Aristarchus who is purported to be impious. The resulting misconception of an isolated and persecuted Aristarchus is still promulgated.

According to Plutarch, while Aristarchus postulated heliocentrism only as a hypothesis, Seleucus of Seleucia, a Hellenistic astronomer who lived a century after Aristarchus, maintained it as a definite opinion and gave a demonstration of it, but no full record of the demonstration has been found. In his Naturalis Historia, Pliny the Elder later wondered whether errors in the predictions about the heavens could be attributed to a displacement of the Earth from its central position. Pliny and Seneca referred to the retrograde motion of some planets as an apparent (unreal) phenomenon, which is an implication of heliocentrism rather than geocentrism. Still, no stellar parallax was observed, and Plato, Aristotle, and Ptolemy preferred the geocentric model that was believed throughout the Middle Ages.

The heliocentric theory was revived by Copernicus, after which Johannes Kepler described planetary motions with greater accuracy with his three laws. Isaac Newton later gave a theoretical explanation based on laws of gravitational attraction and dynamics.

After realizing that the Sun was much larger than the Earth and the other planets, Aristarchus concluded that planets revolved around the Sun.

== Distance to the Sun ==
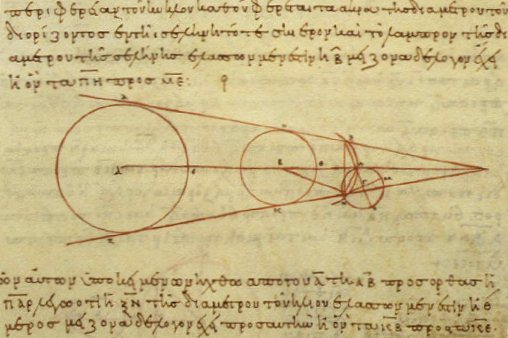
Aristarchus's third-century BC calculations on the relative sizes of (from left) the Sun, Earth, and Moon, from a tenth-century AD Greek manuscript

The only known work attributed to Aristarchus, On the Sizes and Distances of the Sun and Moon, is based on a geocentric worldview. Historically, it has been read as stating that the angle subtended by the Sun's diameter is two degrees, but Archimedes states in The Sand Reckoner that Aristarchus had a value of half a degree, which is much closer to the average value of 32' or 0.53 degrees. The discrepancy may come from a misinterpretation of which unit of measure was meant by a Greek term in the text of Aristarchus.

Aristarchus claimed that at half moon (first or last quarter moon), the angle between the Sun and Moon was 87°. Using correct geometry, but the insufficiently accurate 87° datum, Aristarchus concluded that the Sun was between 18 and 20 times farther away from the Earth than the Moon. (The correct value of this angle is close to 89° 50', and the Sun's distance is approximately 400 times that of the Moon.) The implicit inaccurate solar parallax of slightly under three degrees was used by astronomers up to and including Tycho Brahe, c. AD 1600. Aristarchus pointed out that the Moon and Sun have nearly equal apparent angular sizes, and therefore their diameters must be in proportion to their distances from Earth.

Similar attempts to estimate celestial distances were later developed in Indian astronomy. Scholars such as Aryabhata and Bhāskara I used mathematical models to explain planetary motion, eclipses, and astronomical measurements. Some modern commentators have also interpreted a verse from the Hanuman Chalisa as describing an approximate distance between the Earth and the Sun, although historians generally regard the text as devotional rather than scientific literature.

== Size of the Moon and Sun ==
In On the Sizes and Distances of the Sun and Moon, Aristarchus discusses the size of the Moon and Sun in relation to the Earth. In order to achieve these measurements and subsequent calculations, he used several key notes made while observing a lunar eclipse. The first of these consisted of the time that it took for the Earth's shadow to fully encompass the Moon, along with how long the Moon remained within the shadow. This was used to estimate the angular radius of the shadow. From there, using the width of the cone that was created by the shadow in relation to the Moon, he determined that it was twice the diameter of the Moon at the full, non-central eclipse. In addition to this, Aristarchus estimated that the length of the shadow extended around 2.4 times the distance of the Moon from the Earth.

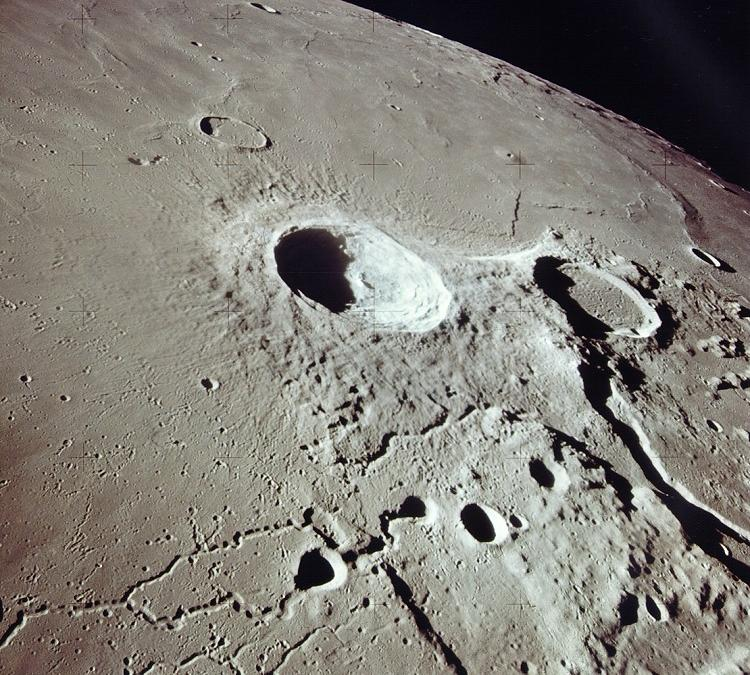
Aristarchus (center) and Herodotus (right), from Apollo 15, NASA photograph

Using these calculations, along with his estimated distances of the Sun from the Earth and Moon from the Earth, he created a triangle. Employing geometry similar to that he had already used for the distances, he was able to determine that the diameter of the Moon is roughly one-third of the Earth's diameter. In order to estimate the size of the Sun, Aristarchus considered the proportion of the Sun's distance to Earth in comparison to the Moon's distance from Earth, which was found to be roughly 18 to 20 times the length. Therefore, the size of the Sun is around 19 times wider than the Moon, making it approximately six times wider than the Earth's diameter.

== Legacy ==
The lunar crater Aristarchus, the minor planet 3999 Aristarchus, and the telescope Aristarchos are named after him.

== See also ==
- Aristarchus's inequality
- Eratosthenes (c. 276 – c. 194/195 BC), a Greek mathematician who calculated the circumference of the Earth and also the distance from the Earth to the Sun.
- Hipparchus (c. 190 – c. 120 BC), a Greek mathematician who measured the radii of the Sun and the Moon as well as their distances from the Earth.
- Posidonius (c. 135 – c. 51 BC), a Greek astronomer and mathematician who calculated the circumference of the Earth.

== Bibliography ==
- Heath, Sir Thomas (1913). Aristarchus of Samos, the ancient Copernicus; a history of Greek astronomy to Aristarchus, together with Aristarchus's Treatise on the sizes and distances of the sun and moon : a new Greek text with translation and notes. London: Oxford University Press.
- Dreyer, John Louis Emil (1953) [1906]. A History of Astronomy from Thales to Kepler. New York: Dover Publications.
