= Eratosthenes =

Greek librarian, mathematician, geographer, and poet

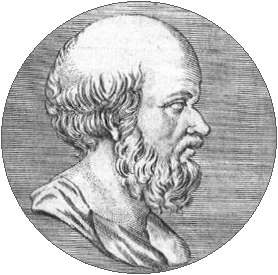
- Eratosthenes
- Born: 276 BC (Note: The Suda states that he was born in the 126th Olympiad, (276–272 BC). Strabo (Geography, i.2.2), though, states that he was a "pupil" (γνώριμος) of Zeno of Citium (who died in 262 BC), which would imply an earlier year of birth (c. 285 BC) since he is unlikely to have studied under him at the young age of 14. However, γνώριμος can also mean "acquaintance", and the year of Zeno's death is by no means definite.); Cyrene (in modern Libya)
- Died: 194 BC (around age 82) (Note: The Suda states he died at the age of 80, Censorinus (De die natali, 15) at the age of 81, and Pseudo-Lucian (Makrobioi, 27) at the age of 82.); Alexandria
- Occupations: Scholar; Librarian; Poet; Inventor
- Known for: Sieve of Eratosthenes; Founder of Geography

Eratosthenes of Cyrene (/ɛrəˈtɒsθəniːz/ err-ə-TOSS-thə-neez; Ancient Greek: Ἐρατοσθένης [eratostʰénɛːs]; c. 276 BC – c. 195/194 BC) was an Ancient Greek polymath: a philosopher, scholar, mathematician, geographer, poet, astronomer, and music theorist. Eratosthenes eventually became the chief librarian at the Library of Alexandria. His work was the precursor to the modern discipline of geography, and he introduced some of its terminology, coining the terms geography and geographer.

He is best remembered as the first known person to calculate the Earth's circumference. He was also the first to calculate Earth's axial tilt, which similarly proved to have remarkable accuracy. He created the first global projection of the world incorporating parallels and meridians based on the geographic knowledge of his era. Eratosthenes was the founder of scientific chronology; he used Egyptian and Persian records to estimate the dates of the main events of the Trojan War, dating the sack of Troy to 1184 BC. In number theory, he introduced the sieve of Eratosthenes, an efficient method of identifying prime numbers and composite numbers.

His devotees nicknamed him Pentathlos after the Olympians who competed in that multi-event contest, for he had proven himself to be knowledgeable in every area of learning. Yet, according to an entry in the Suda (a 10th-century Byzantine encyclopedia), some critics scorned him, calling him Beta (Second, or Number 2) because he always came in second in all his endeavors.

== Life ==
The son of Aglaos, Eratosthenes was born in 276 BC in Cyrene. Now part of modern-day Libya, Cyrene had been founded by Greeks during the second half of the 7th century BCE, and its proximity to the sea, its defensible position, its abundant water sources and its rich soil all contributed to its status as the capital city of Cyrenaica. Cyrene came under the rule of Alexander the Great in 332 BC, and following his death in 323 BC, after a local civil war, it was seized by one of his generals, Ptolemy I Soter, the founder of the Ptolemaic Kingdom. When Cyrene came under Ptolemaic rule, it had a rich economy, based largely on the export of horses and silphium, (Note: Silphium was a plant used for rich seasoning and medicine, now extinct.) and was long known as a prosperous hub of Greek culture.

According to Roller, the rarity of both Eratosthenes' and his father's names are indicative of his humble origins, although due to the possibilities of upward mobility in the Hellenistic world he was not limited by them. However, Matthew (modern scholar) suggests that his name, meaning "lovely strength" suggests noble upbringing, as does his education from a young age, which could imply his belonging to the aristocracy of Cyrene. Like any young Greek at the time, Eratosthenes would have studied in the local gymnasium, where he would have learned physical skills as well as reading, writing, arithmetic, poetry, and music.

By the late 260s BCE, Eratosthenes went to Athens to further his studies. According to Strabo, he was taught Stoicism there by the school's founder, Zeno of Citium, though their interaction would have been minimal, since Zeno died shortly after Eratosthenes arrived. Strabo also lists the little-known Apelles of Chios among his teachers. Eratosthenes is said to have studied under the cynic Aristo of Chios, and the eclectic Bion of Borysthenes. He was further taught by the recently appointed head of the Platonic Academy, Arcesilaus of Pitane. Eratosthenes' later mathematical work implies that he received mathematical training there. According to the Suda Eratosthenes was also a student of Lysanias of Cyrene, a philologist and grammarian who focused on Homer. The poet, scholar, and librarian Callimachus is likely to have crossed paths with Eratosthenes in local debates and scholarly discourse, even though it is unlikely he was ever formally his teacher.

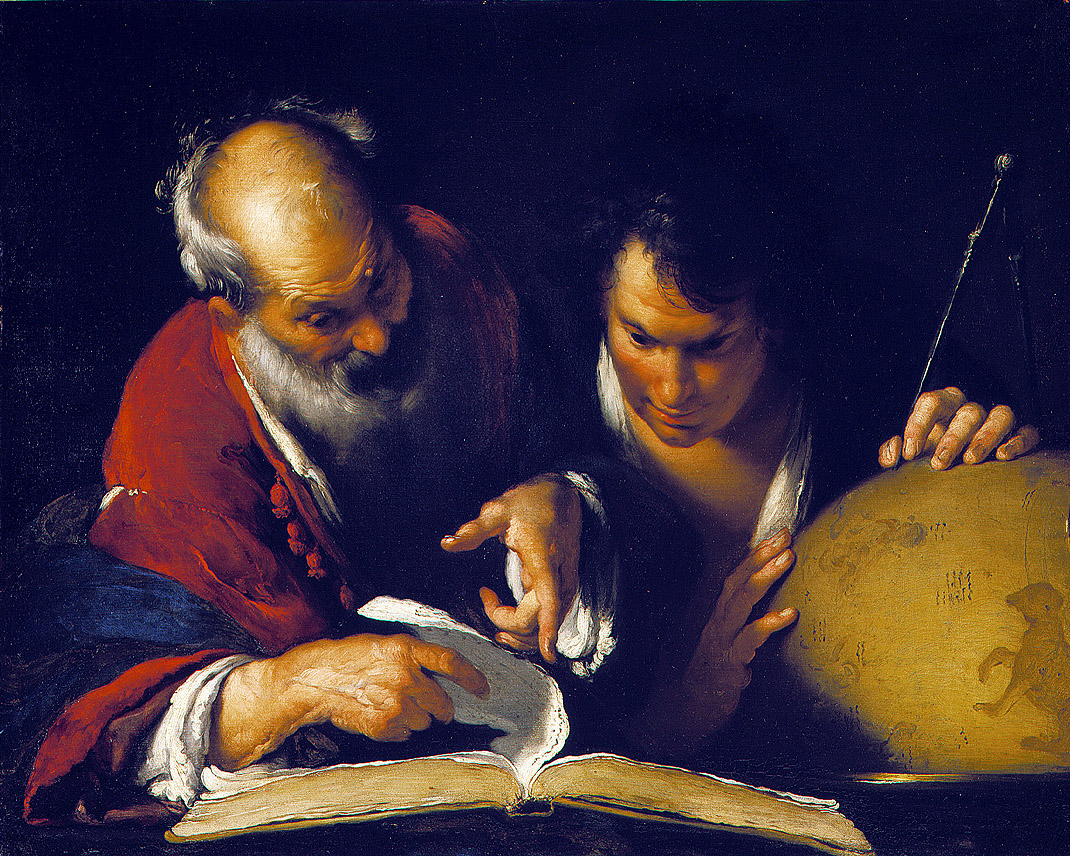
Eratosthenes teaching in Alexandria by Bernardo Strozzi (1635)

Strabo complained that Eratosthenes did not pay enough respect to Zeno and criticized him for his association with such varied schools of thought. He believed Eratosthenes was unwilling to commit to philosophy and had learned only enough to appear as a philosopher, seeing it as nothing more than a distraction from his regular work. Later authors may have shared this view to some extent: The Suda states that Eratosthenes was referred to as Beta (Second, or Number 2), because he was not seen as the leading expert in any given field. (Note: Though this may have been because he was the second chief librarian in Alexandria.) Others dubbed him Pentathlos (Πένταθλος – All-Rounded), given his various skills and areas of knowledge; Pentathlos, however, is also the title of an athlete who competes in many events but comes in second in all of them. Strabo described Eratosthenes as a mathematician among geographers and a geographer among mathematicians.

The majority of Eratosthenes' studies focused on philosophy; mathematics was less prominent, and philology even less so. Despite his later contributions to the field, Eratosthenes could not formally study geography, as such a discipline did not exist at the time. Eratosthenes was however exposed to extensive geographic literature, such as the works of Homer, whom he considered the first geographer, Hecataeus of Miletus (Circuit of the Earth), Aeschylus, Herodotus, and others. Additionally, Eratosthenes was born forty years after the death of Alexander the Great, and he would also have encountered the works of Alexander's travel companions Androsthenes, Nearchos, Onesikratos, Ptolemy I, and others, who wrote about their journeys with him, and whose conquests cleared the path for Hellenistic explorers.

Eratosthenes remained in Athens for some twenty years, studying and writing. During this period, he wrote Platonikos, inquiring into the mathematics and music in Plato's philosophy, as well as the poetic works of Hermes and Erigone. His Chronographies focused on the important dates of the Trojan War, and his Olympic Victors compiled a list of the winners of the Olympic games. Little more is known about this period of his life.

In 246 BCE, Ptolemy III succeeded his father, Ptolemy II. Over the next twenty-five years, the Ptolemaic Empire reached its greatest extent, and Alexandria attained its zenith as an intellectual center. The post of librarian, which included the position of royal tutor to Ptolemy IV Philopator, became the most prestigious academic appointment. The reigning librarian, Apollonius of Rhodes, was forced into retirement by the new king (possibly through the influence of Callimachus), and Eratosthenes, who by this time was gaining fame as a scholar and a poet in the tradition of Callimachus, was summoned from Athens to replace him. Roller suggests that Eratosthenes' roots in Cyrene, the native city of Callimachus, and more importantly Queen Berenike, contributed favorably to his appointment.

The beginning of Eratosthenes' career in Alexandria was focused on mathematics. He was closely affiliated with Archimedes, who sent him material for comment and praised him enthusiastically for his contributions; his Method of Mechanical Theorems was written as a letter to Eratosthenes, and he sent Eratosthenes the famous Cattle Problem to be presented to the mathematicians of Alexandria. Eratosthenes subsequently wrote compositions on geography, philosophy, rhetoric, literary criticism, grammar, poetry and star lore. D. R. Dicks suggests that his astronomical contributions were hardly notable, (Note: It appears that, outside of the geographical context, Eratosthenes did not contribute any original work in the field of astronomy. His name was not associated with any astronomical observations, nor was he cited as an authority in Ptolemy's works on astronomical calendars and parapegmata. Additionally, doubt has been cast on the attribution of the measurement of the sun to him by Eusebius and Macrobius, and the one astronomical title associated with his name, Catasterismi, is considered to be incorrectly attributed, and the lost work upon which it was possibly based can hardly be considered astronomical.) and it was said that his poetry strangely contained the very didactic elements which he condemned.

Toward the end of his days, he served as an advisor and companion to Arsinoe, sister and wife of Ptolemy IV. According to the Suda, as he aged his eyesight began to fail. Losing the ability to read and to observe nature plagued and depressed him, leading him to voluntarily starve himself to death. He died at the age of 80 in Alexandria around 196 BCE. Roller notes that Dionysios of Kyzikos recorded the genuine epitaph of Eratosthenes, bemoaning the fact that he was buried in a foreign land, with "the shore of Proteus" being a Homeric allusion to the land of Egypt:

A softening old age with no darkening through disease quenched you and put you to deserved sleep pondering great things, Eratosthenes. Mother Kyrene did not receive you into the paternal tombs, son of Aglaos, but you are buried as a friend in a foreign land, here on the edge of the shore of Proteus.

The Suda records four students of Eratosthenes: Aristophanes of Byzantium, his successor as Librarian of Alexandria, the geographer Mnaseus of Patara in Lycia, the historian Menander, probably of Ephesos, and Aristis, who was otherwise unknown.

== Contributions ==
=== Astronomy ===
==== Measurement of Earth's circumference ====
Measure of Earth's circumference according to Cleomedes's simplified version, based on the approximation that Syene is on the Tropic of Cancer and on the same meridian as Alexandria

The Earth's circumference is the most famous measurement obtained by Eratosthenes. (Note: There is much disagreement over the dimension of the unit of length Eratosthenes used, the stade, with the possibilities being 160 m (520 ft) (Messenian), 177 m (581 ft) (Delphic), 180 m (590 ft) (Pan-Hellenic), 185 m (607 ft) (Attic), 191 m (627 ft) (Olympic) and 210 m (690 ft) (Ptolemaic). The size of the stade has direct influence on the measurement of the circumference. After a long discussion, Matthew concluded that Eratosthenes' original calculation resulted in a circumference of approximately 224,100 stadia, which, based on the use of the Pan-Hellenic stade of 180 m, is equivalent to 40,338 km (25,065 mi) with a margin of error of less than 1%. An approximation extremely close to modern day measurements. Concluding the same discussion, Matthew suggested that one generation later Hipparchus adjusted Eratosthenes' result to 250,000 stadia, and an even later Cleomedes attributed this number to Eratosthenes. Due to an error in transmission, or the intent to match the measurement with the ideal of Platonic numerical perfection, Roman sources of the 1st century CE altered the distance to 252,000 stadia, which was altered again in the 4th century CE to 259,200 stadia, due to an error in transmission or because it divides evenly into degrees, minutes and seconds. Most modern studies follow Cleoemedes or the Roman period measurements of 250,000 and 252,000 stadia respectively.) He described his arc measurement technique in his book On the Measure of the Earth, which has not been preserved. However, a simplified version of the method as described by Cleomedes was preserved.

The simplified method works by considering two cities along the same meridian, and the difference in angles of the shadows cast by the sun on a vertical rod (a gnomon). The two cities used by Eratosthenes were Alexandria and Syene (modern Aswan). At noon on the summer solstice, there were still shadows in Alexandria. However, in Syene, rods cast no shadows, and the Sun's rays shone straight down into the city-center well.

According to Cleomedes, Eratosthenes then measured the shadow's angle to be about 7.2 degrees, which is 1/50 of a full circle, and reasoned using alternate interior angles that this angle represented the portion of Earth's curvature between the two cities. The distance between Alexandria and Syene was reported to be about 5,000 stadia, as measured by professional bematists. Eratosthenes multiplied this number by 50 and arrived at a total of roughly 250,000 stadia for the Earth's circumference.

This calculation is expressed algebraically as $C = \frac{360^\circ d}{\Delta\theta}$

where $C$ is the Earth's circumference, $d$ is the distance between the two cities, and ${\Delta\theta}$ is the difference in the two cities' shadow angles.

According to Matthew, the result of Eratosthenes calculation is approximately 40,338 km (25,065 mi), while the modern day measurement of the circumference around the equator is 40,075.017 km (24,901.461 mi); passing through the poles the circumference is 40,007.863 km (24,859.734 mi).

While Eratosthenes' method was sound he made two false assumptions which fortuitously cancelled each other out. The first was that Syene was on the Tropic of Cancer and the second was that it lay on the same meridian of longitude (directly south) of Alexandria. In fact Syene is 1° north of the Tropic and 3° east of Alexandria.

==== Sun measurements ====
Eusebius of Caesarea in his Preparatio Evangelica includes a brief chapter of three sentences on celestial distances. He states simply that Eratosthenes found the distance to the Sun to be "σταδίων μυριάδας τετρακοσίας καὶ ὀκτωκισμυρίας" (literally "of stadia myriads 400 and 80,000") and the distance to the Moon to be 780,000 stadia. The expression for the distance to the Sun has been translated either as 4,080,000 stadia or as 804,000,000 stadia. The meaning depends on whether Eusebius meant 400 myriad plus 80,000 or "400 and 80,000" myriad. With a stade of 185 m (607 ft), 804,000,000 stadia is 149,000,000 km (93,000,000 mi), approximately the distance from the Earth to the Sun.

Eratosthenes also calculated the Sun's diameter. According to Macrobius, Eratosthenes made the diameter of the Sun to be about 27 times that of the Earth. The actual figure is approximately 109 times.

==== Obliquity of the ecliptic ====
Eratosthenes determined the obliquity of the ecliptic. The ecliptic is the apparent circular orbit of the sun projected onto the imaginary celestial sphere over the course of a year; its obliquity is the inclination of its plane relative to the plane of the equator. The value of this angle is not constant; at the time of Eratosthenes, it was 23° 43′ 40″. As early as the 5th century BC, Oenopides of Chios had determined 24°; Eratosthenes improved the accuracy of the measurement. He determined the angular distance between the two tropics as of the full circle (360°), i.e., 47° 42′ 40″, which, when halved, yields a value of 23° 51′ 20″. How he arrived at this result is unknown; the hypotheses considered in research are speculative. While at the Library of Alexandria, Eratosthenes devised a calendar using his predictions about the ecliptic of the Earth. He calculated that there are 365 days in a year and that every fourth year there would be 366 days. The Greek astronomer Hipparchus (c. 190 – c. 120 BC) credited Eratosthenes (276 – 194 BC) as the inventor of the armillary sphere, a model of objects in the sky (on the celestial sphere), consisting of a spherical framework of rings, centered on Earth or the Sun, that represent lines of celestial longitude and latitude and other astronomically important features, such as the ecliptic.

=== Geography ===
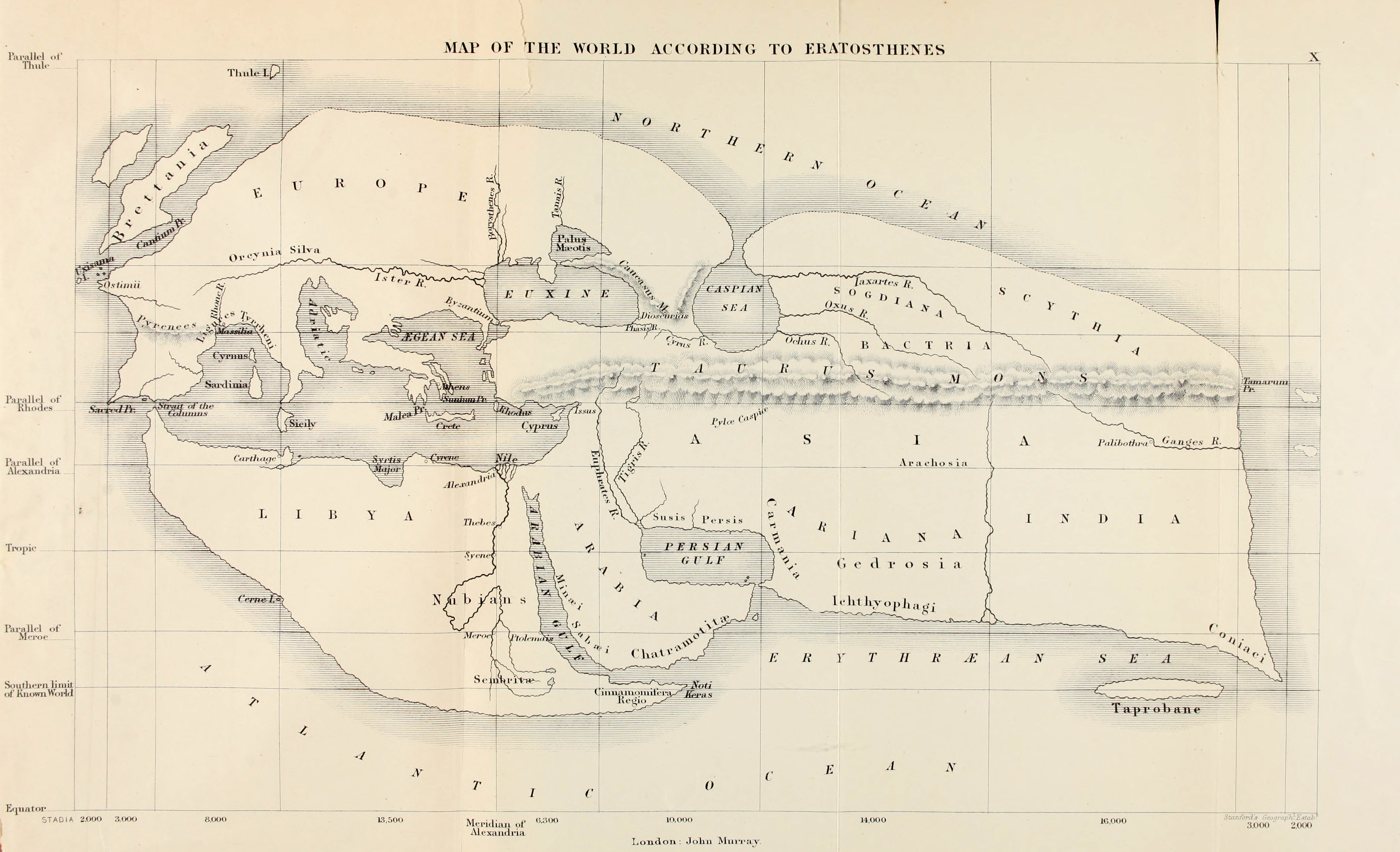
19th-century reconstruction of Eratosthenes's map of the (for the Greeks) known world, c. 194 BC

Eratosthenes continued to study the Earth, and began to sketch it. In the Library of Alexandria he had access to travel books, which contained information and representations of the world that needed to be pieced together in some organized format. In his three-volume work Geography (Ancient Greek: Geographika), he described and mapped his entire known world, even dividing the Earth into five climate zones: two freezing zones around the poles, two temperate zones, and a zone encompassing the equator and the tropics. He placed grids of overlapping lines over the surface of the Earth. He used parallels and meridians to link together every place in the world. It was then possible to estimate the distance from remote locations with this network over the surface of the Earth. In the Geography he recorded the names of over 400 cities and their locations were shown, a feat without precedent.

According to Strabo, Eratosthenes argued against the Greek-Barbarian dichotomy and said Alexander ignored his advisers by his regard for all people with law and government. (Note: Plutarch's similar discussion claiming that Alexander ignored Aristotle's advice in this matter may have been influenced by Eratosthenes, but Plutarch does not confirm his sources.) Though he argued that Eratosthenes was wrong to claim that Alexander had disregarded the counsel of his advisers asserting that it was Alexander's interpretation of their "real intent" in recognizing that "in some people there prevail the law-abiding and the political instinct, and the qualities associated with education and powers of speech".

=== Mathematics, music theory and metaphysics ===
In Platonikos, primarily mathematical questions were dealt with; the concepts discussed included distance, ratio, continuous and discontinuous proportion, mathematical mean, prime number and point. The focus was on the theory of proportions, in which Eratosthenes saw the key to Platonic philosophy. He applied the tool of the ratio equation ("a is to b as c is to d"), which he called "analogy", to both mathematics and philosophy. Friedrich Solmsen states that in proportion, he believed he had found the unifying bond of the "mathematical" sciences (arithmetic, geometry, astronomy, music theory), since all statements of these sciences could ultimately be traced back to statements about proportions.

According to Theon of Smyrna, he perceived ratio as the foundational principle which underlies proportion, as well as the "primary cause of the creation of all orderly things", while he saw the number one as the starting point (archḗ) and the primary element (stoicheíon) of numbers and quantity.

For Eratosthenes, numbers are unproblematic; but lines, on the other hand, are curious, as they cannot be produced by the combination of individual points, since the individual point has no extension. Eratosthenes contends rather it arises from the continuous movement of a point. This view was later criticized by the skeptic Sextus Empiricus.

Sieve of Eratosthenes: algorithm steps for primes below 121 (including optimization of starting from the prime's square)

Eratosthenes proposed a mathematical approximate solution to the problem of doubling the cube, (Note: It was called the "Delian problem" because the oracle of Delphi said the way to defeat a plague in Delos was by doubling the size of a cube-shaped altar to Apollo.) which was unsolvable with compass and ruler. In order to solve this problem, he constructed a mechanical line drawing device to calculate the cube, called the Mesolabio. He dedicated his solution to King Ptolemy, presenting a model in bronze, with a letter and an epigram.

Eratosthenes used an algorithm that allows one to separate all prime numbers from the set of all odd natural numbers that are less than or equal to a given number. This method is known as the Sieve of Eratosthenes (Greek: κόσκινον Ἐρατοσθένους). However, according to Hans-Joachim Waschkies, he did not invent it – as was previously believed; rather, it was already known, and he only coined the term "sieve".

Eratosthenes' sieve is one of a number of prime number sieves, and is a simple, ancient algorithm for finding all prime numbers up to any given limit. It does so by iteratively marking as composite, i.e., not prime, the multiples of each prime, starting with the multiples of 2. The multiples of a given prime are generated starting from that prime, as a sequence of numbers with the same difference, equal to that prime, between consecutive numbers. This is the sieve's key distinction from using trial division to sequentially test each candidate number for divisibility by each prime.

A secondary subject of Platonikos was music theory, in which Eratosthenes applied the theory of proportions to music, Since antiquity, he is considered an authority in the field of music. The scholar Ptolemy preserved Eratosthenes' calculations for the tetrachord, which show that he used the "Pythagorean" tuning, which he then refined. Eratosthenes knew and considered the system of the music theorist Aristoxenus. However, Ptolemy does not disclose how he proceeded with his calculations.

Eratosthenes addressed metaphysics such as the doctrine of the soul in the Platonikos. Like the Platonist Crantor, by whom he was probably influenced, he held the view that the soul could not be purely immaterial, but must have something corporeal about it, for it exists in the world of sensible things; moreover, it is always in a body. This is based on the idea that the soul can only grasp sensible objects if it has a corresponding disposition in its own structure. Accordingly, it is a mixture of two components, one incorporeal and one corporeal.

== Works ==
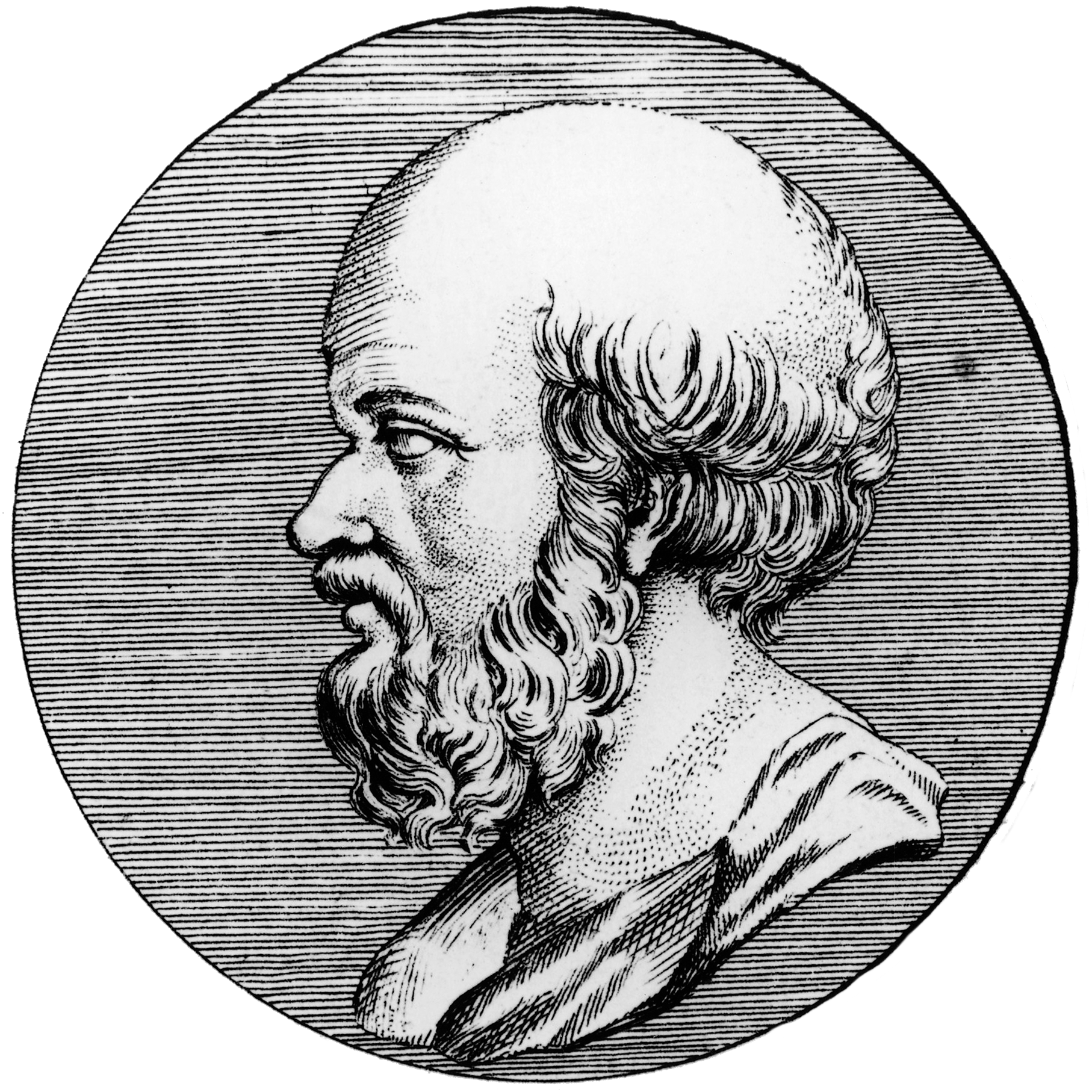
Etching by Philipp Daniel Lippert, Dactyliothec, 1767

Eratosthenes was one of the most eminent scholars of his time, and produced works covering a vast area of knowledge before and during his time at the Library. There are no documents left of his work after the destruction of the Library of Alexandria.

=== Athenian period ===
- Platonikos – Most probably Eratosthenes' main mathematical treatise, of which only few extracts remain, found in the Expositio rerum mathematicarum ad legendum Platonem utilium, by Theon of Smyrna. It is unclear whether the work was a commentary on Plato's Timaeus or a dialogue with Plato as the principal speaker. It is suggested that it served as a handbook intended to make Plato's works easier for a wider audience to access by clarifying terms and explaining difficult passages.
- On the Old Comedy – A work of literary criticism consisting of twelve books, which attempted to derive the authorship of plays from the dates they were performed, included discussions of textual criticism and contained a section on the meaning and usage of words. The latter was highly praised and often cited by ancient authors.
- Anterinys/Hesiod – A poetic work, now lost, the contents of which are unknown.
- Erigone – A poetic work depicting the star legend of Icarius, his daughter Erigone and her dog Maera, according to which Erigone committed suicide upon hearing about the death of her father. The work contained astronomical elements, as the characters were translated as the heavenly bodies of Boötes, Virgo, and Sirius.
- Hermes – A poetic work, of which some sixteen lines have survived. It paralleled the beginning of the Homeric hymn, but added to it the heavenward ascent of Hermes which included a vivid description of the different climate zones of the inhabited world, and contained "a good deal of descriptive astronomy" in the words of Thomas Heath.

=== Alexandrian period ===
- On Intermediate Terms (Peri mesotḗtōn) – A work attributed to Eratosthenes by Pappus, of the late third century CE. Its contents were lost, but it can be said that it consisted of two books, and was of enough importance to be included in what Pappus called the "Treasury of Analysis" together with the writings of Euclid, Apollonius, and Aristaeus, thus implying that it was a systematic geometrical composition. In another passage, Pappus refers to "loci with reference to means" which were discussed by Eratosthenes, supposedly in the work mentioned, the nature of these loci in unknown. Since this work is not mentioned anywhere else in ancient sources, some have suggested that it is identical with Platonikos. In 1981, a medieval Arabic translation of a text by "Aristanes" (Eratosthenes) on mean proportionals was published. However, this is not the lost work On Intermediate Terms mentioned by Pappus, but an alleged letter from Eratosthenes to King Ptolemy III about the doubling of a cube, which is preserved in the original Greek text. The authenticity of the letter is disputed. (Note: Geus argues for the authenticity of the letter, which is usually considered a forgery, and provides a German translation on pages 196–200.)
- The Catasterismi ("Placings among stars"), cited in the Suda under the title Astronomy. The extant work by this name in its current form cannot be attributed to Eratosthenes, however it is rooted in a genuine work by him with the same name. The Catasterismi contained a star catalogue, which references the writings of Aratus, but as opposed to the largely technical descriptions of Aratus, it includes a collection of legends relating to individual stars and constellations. The catalogue contains 42 entries covering all the constellations, one entry on the planets and one entry on the milky way; it includes a list of stars belonging to each constellation, with their locations within the constellation, all together number 736, (though Hipparchus has approximately 1,000). It has been pointed out, that Eratosthenes did not invent the myths, which had been transmitted over centuries through Greek traditions, rather he connected these tales to the constellations and attributed the different mythical characters to them.
- Arsinoe (a memoir of queen Arsinoe; lost; quoted by Athenaeus in the Deipnosophistae) – A biography or eulogy of Arsinoe III, wife and sister of Ptolemy IV, who was murdered at the age of 30 after her husband's death. Eratosthenes had been her advisor and companion in public events. The writing of the work is the last datable event in the life of Eratosthenes, and the work itself is likely the last that he wrote, as Arsinoe's death occurred in 204 BCE, Eratosthenes was about eighty years old at the time, and he did not live for much longer.
- On the Measurement of the Earth (Περὶ τῆς ἀναμετρήσεως τῆς γῆς) – Described as a separate work by Heron in his Dioptra, and according to Galen it dealt with astronomical or mathematical geography. Among the topics discussed were the size of the equator, the distance of the tropic and polar circles, the size of the polar area, the sizes of the sun and the moon and the distances from them and their total and partial eclipses and the changes in the length of the day according to location and date.
- Geographica (ГεωγραΦικά) – The work was the first attempt at providing a mathematical foundation for geographical studies, as well as the first recorded instance of many terms still in use, including the name of the science geography. It is now lost, but 155 fragments survive, 105 in the writings of Strabo, 16 in the writings of Pliny the Elder, and the rest scattered in Byzantine sources. According to Strabo, who is the primary source for its form and content, it consisted of three parts. For a long time it was the main authority on geographical matters, and was referred to by Julius Caesar in De Bello Gallico, when he mentioned that Eratosthenes knew of the Hercynian Forest. Even the critical Strabo admitted that Eratosthenes was the leading authority on the southeastern quarter of the inhabited world. The work described the global landmass as a whole, discussed its division into regions, estimated distances, landscape alterations, the location of the inhabited world, and included limited descriptions of lands and peoples. The work was criticized by Strabo, who complained that Eratosthenes' approach was too mathematical, and by Hipparchus, who argued that it was not mathematical enough, as Eratosthenes did not make sufficient use of astronomical data in establishing the reference lines of his map. It is possible that the circumference of the Earth was written as part of the Geographica, though if it wasn't, it was most likely mentioned in it. Its detailed description is now known only through De Motu Circulari by Cleomedes. The first book was something of an introduction and gave a review of his predecessors, recognizing their contributions that he compiled in the library. In this book Eratosthenes denounced Homer as not providing any insight into what he described as geography. His disapproval of Homer's topography angered many who believed the world depicted in the Odyssey to be legitimate. He commented on the ideas of the nature and origin of the Earth: he thought of Earth as an immovable globe while its surface was changing. He hypothesized that at one time the Mediterranean had been a vast lake that covered the countries that surrounded it and that it only became connected to the ocean to the west when a passage opened up sometime in its history. The second book contains his calculation of the circumference of the Earth. This is where, according to Pliny, "The world was grasped." Here Eratosthenes described his famous story of the well in Syene. This book would later be considered a text on mathematical geography. His third book of the Geography contained political geography. He cited countries and used parallel lines to divide the map into sections, to give accurate descriptions of the realms. This was a breakthrough that can be considered the beginning of geography. For this, Eratosthenes was named the "Father of Modern Geography".
- Chronographies and Olympic Victors – Two works that represent the first systematic, scientific treatment of chronological questions by a Greek author and that established a dating system based on the Olympiads. Olympic Victors was likely a popularizing work and included numerous anecdotes, some preserved by Plutarch. Clement of Alexandria summarized its main results. It provides dates for several events: the fall of Troy (1184/1183 BCE), the Dorian migration (1104/1103 BCE), the first Olympiad (777/776 BCE), Xerxes' invasion (480/479 BCE), and the outbreak of the Peloponnesian War (432/431 BCE), Eratosthenes' dates are still considered authoritative.

=== Additional works ===
- A means of determining prime numbers (the Sieve of Eratosthenes)
- A work on instrumentation
- The calculation of harmonics
- A treatise on philosophy (On Good and Bad)
- A work on rhetoric (On Declamation)
- A literary critique of the works of the poet Homer
- An extensive discussion of the nature of old comedy
- A correction of the calendar (On the 8-Year Cycle)
- An examination of planetary orbits
- An examination of the winds
- Philosophical analyses (On the Philosophical Sects and On Freedom from Pain)
- Dialogues and grammatical works
- A discussion of wealth and poverty
- A history of the campaigns of Alexander the Great (uncertain)

== See also ==
- Aristarchus of Samos (c. 310 – c. 230 BC), a Greek mathematician who calculated the distance from the Earth to the Sun.
- Eratosthenes (crater) on the Moon.
- Eratosthenian period in the lunar geologic timescale.
- Eratosthenes Seamount in the eastern Mediterranean Sea.
- Eratosthenes Point in Antarctica.
- Hipparchus (c. 190 – c. 120 BC), a Greek mathematician who measured the radii of the Sun and the Moon as well as their distances from the Earth.
- Posidonius (c. 135 – c. 51 BC), a Greek astronomer and mathematician who calculated the circumference of the Earth.

== Notes ==
Preceded by Apollonius of Rhodes	Head of the Library of Alexandria	Succeeded by Aristophanes of Byzantium
