= Cleomedes =

Ancient Greek astronomer

Cleomedes (Greek: Κλεομήδης) was a Greek astronomer who is known chiefly for his book On the Circular Motions of the Celestial Bodies (Κυκλικὴ θεωρία μετεώρων), also known as The Heavens (Latin: Caelestia).

== Placing his work chronologically ==
His birth and death dates are not known—historians have suggested that he wrote his work sometime between the mid-1st century BC and 400 AD. The earlier estimates rely on the fact that Cleomedes refers extensively in his writing to the work of mathematician and astronomer Posidonius of Rhodes (c. 135 – c. 51 BC), and yet seemingly not at all to the work of Ptolemy (c. 100 – c. 170 AD). Cleomedes also refers to Aristotle (384–322 BC), Pytheas of Massalia (310–306 BC), Aratus (c. 315/310 BC – 240 BC), Eratosthenes (276–195 BC), and Hipparchus (c. 190 – c. 120 BC). These conclusions have been challenged on the grounds that Cleomedes' work was in relatively elementary astronomy, and that reference to Ptolemy would not necessarily be expected. The 20th century mathematician Otto Neugebauer, however, looked closely at the astronomical observations made by Cleomedes, and concluded that a date of 371 AD (±50 years) better explains what is found there. Neugebauer's estimate has been challenged on the grounds that Cleomedes makes observational errors with enough frequency that there is difficulty in deciding which observations to trust for the purpose of dating his work.

== On the Circular Motions of the Celestial Bodies ==
The book for which Cleomedes is known is a fairly basic astronomy textbook in two volumes. His purpose in writing seems to have been as philosophical as it was scientific—he spends an extensive amount of time criticizing the scientific ideas of the Epicureans.

Cleomedes' book is valued primarily for preserving, apparently verbatim, much of Posidonius' writings on astronomy (none of Posidonius' books have survived to the modern day). Cleomedes is accurate in some of his remarks on lunar eclipses, especially his conjecture that the shadow on the Moon suggests a spherical Earth. He also remarks presciently that the absolute size of many stars may exceed that of the Sun (and that the Earth might appear as a very small star, if viewed from the surface of the Sun).

This book is the original source for the well-known story of how Eratosthenes measured the Earth's circumference. Many modern mathematicians and astronomers believe the description to be reasonable (and believe Eratosthenes' achievement to be one of the more impressive accomplishments of ancient astronomy).

Cleomedes deserves credit for the earliest clear statement of the apparent distance explanation of the Sun Illusion or Moon Illusion. He argued that the sun appeared farther away on the horizon than in the zenith, and therefore larger (since its angular size was constant). He attributed this explanation to Posidonius.

== Optics ==
As a disciple of Posidonius, Cleomedes noted some elementary qualitative properties of refraction, such as the bending of a ray toward the perpendicular in passing from a less dense to a more dense medium, and suggested that due to atmospheric refraction, the Sun and its rainbow may be visible when the Sun is below the horizon.

== Legacy ==
Cleomedes is now memorialized by the crater Cleomedes in the northeastern portion of the visible Moon.
