= Posidonius =

Greek Stoic philosopher (c.135 – c.51 BC)

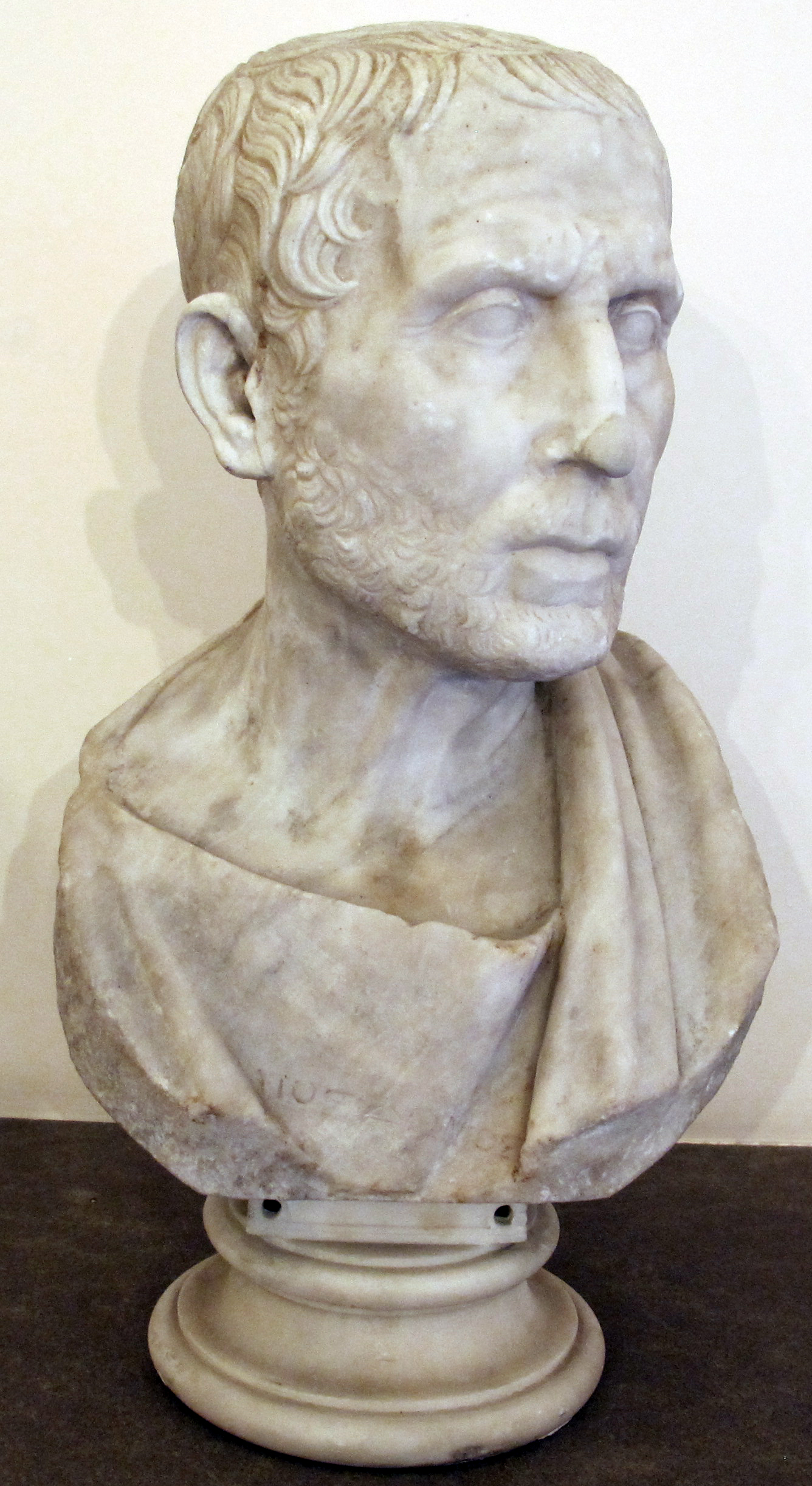
- Bust of Posidonius from the Naples National Archaeological Museum
- Born: c. 135 BC; Apamea Seleucid Empire
- Died: c. 51 BC (aged 83–84); Rhodes or Rome

Philosophical work
- Era: Hellenistic philosophy
- Region: Western philosophy
- School: Stoicism
- Main interests: Astronomy, geography, history, mathematics, meteorology, philosophy, physics
- Notable ideas: Cosmic sympathy

Posidonius (/ˌpɒsɪˈdoʊniəs/; Ancient Greek: Ποσειδώνιος Poseidṓnios; "of Apamea" (ὁ Ἀπαμεύς) or "of Rhodes" (ὁ Ῥόδιος); c. 135 – c. 51 BC) was a Greek politician, astronomer, astrologer, geographer, historian, mathematician, and teacher native to Apamea, Syria. He was considered the most learned man of his time and, possibly, of the entire Stoic school.

After a period learning Stoic philosophy from Panaetius in Athens, he spent many years in travel and scientific researches in Spain, Africa, Italy, Gaul, Liguria, Sicily, and on the eastern shores of the Adriatic. He settled as a teacher in Rhodes, where his fame attracted numerous scholars.

Next to Panaetius he did most, by writings and personal lectures, to spread Stoicism to the Roman world, and he became well known to many leading men, including Pompey and Cicero.

His works are now lost, but they proved a mine of information to later writers. The titles and subjects of more than twenty of them are known. In common with other Stoics of the middle period, he displayed syncretic tendencies, following not just the earlier Stoics, but making use of the works of Plato and Aristotle.

A polymath as well as a philosopher, he took genuine interest in natural science, geography, natural history, mathematics, and astronomy. He sought to determine the distance and magnitude of the Sun, to calculate the diameter of the Earth, and to determine the influence of the Moon on the tides.

== Life ==
=== Early life and education ===
Posidonius, nicknamed "the Athlete" (Ἀθλητής), was born around 135 BC. He was born into a Greek family in Apamea, a Hellenistic city on the Orontes River in northern Syria. As historian Philip Freeman puts it: "Posidonius was Greek to the core". Posidonius expressed no love for his native city, Apamea, in his writings and he mocked its inhabitants.

As a young man he moved to Athens and studied under Panaetius, the leading Stoic philosopher of the age, and the last undisputed head (scholarch) of the Stoic school in Athens. When Panaetius died in 110 BC, Posidonius would have been around 25 years old. Rather than remain in Athens, he instead settled in Rhodes, and gained citizenship. In Rhodes, Posidonius maintained his own school which would become the leading institution of the time.

=== Travels ===
Around the 90s BC Posidonius embarked on a series of voyages around the Mediterranean gathering scientific data and observing the customs and people of the places he visited. He traveled in Greece, Hispania, Italy, Sicily, Dalmatia, Gaul, Liguria, North Africa, and on the eastern shores of the Adriatic.

In Hispania, on the Atlantic coast in Gades (the modern Cádiz), Posidonius could observe tides much higher than in his native Mediterranean. He wrote that daily tides are related to the Moon's orbit, while tidal heights vary with the cycles of the Moon, and he hypothesized about yearly tidal cycles synchronized with the equinoxes and solstices.

In Gaul, he studied the Celts. He left descriptions of customs such as nailing skulls to doorways as trophies, which he witnessed, and vivid legends told to him by the Celts, such as a story that in the past, men were paid to allow their throats to be slit for public amusement. But he noted that the Celts honored the Druids, whom Posidonius saw as philosophers, and concluded that, even among the barbaric, "pride and passion give way to wisdom, and Ares stands in awe of the Muses." Posidonius wrote a geographic treatise on the lands of the Celts which has since been lost, but which is referred to extensively (both directly and otherwise) in the works of Diodorus of Sicily, Strabo, Caesar and Tacitus' Germania.

=== Political offices ===
In Rhodes, Posidonius actively took part in political life, and he attained high office when he was appointed as one of the Prytaneis. This was the most important political office in Rhodes, combining presidential and executive functions, of which there were five (or possibly six) men holding the office for a six-month period.

He was chosen for at least one embassy to Rome in 87/86, during the Marian and Sullan era. Although the purpose of the embassy is unknown, this was at the time of the First Mithridatic War when Roman rule over the Greek cities was being challenged by Mithridates VI of Pontus and the political situation was delicate.

=== The Stoic school on Rhodes ===
Under Posidonius, Rhodes eclipsed Athens to become the new centre for Stoic philosophy in the 1st century BC. This process may have already have begun under Panaetius, who was a native of Rhodes, and may have fostered a school there. Ian Kidd remarks that Rhodes "was attractive, not only as an independent city, commercially prosperous, go-ahead and with easy links of movement in all directions, but because it was welcoming to intellectuals, for it already had a strong reputation particularly for scientific research from men like Hipparchus."

Although little is known of the organization of his school, it is clear that Posidonius had a steady stream of Greek and Roman students, as demonstrated by the eminent Romans who visited it. Pompey sat in on a lecture in 66 and did so again in 62 on return from campaigning in the East. On this latter occasion the subject of the lecture was "There is no good but moral good". Posidonius was probably in his seventies at this time and was suffering from gout. He illustrated the theme of his lecture by pointing to his painful leg and declaring "It is no good, pain; bothersome you may be, but you will never persuade me that you are an evil."

When Cicero was in his late twenties, he attended a course of Posidonius' lectures, and later invited Posidonius to write a monograph on Cicero's own consulship (Posidonius politely refused). In his later writings Cicero repeatedly refers to Posidonius as "my teacher" and "my dear friend". Posidonius died in his eighties in 51 BC; his grandson, Jason of Nysa, succeeded him as head of the school on Rhodes.

== Partial scope of writings ==
Posidonius was celebrated as a polymath throughout the Graeco-Roman world because he came near to mastering all the knowledge of his time, similar to Aristotle and Eratosthenes. He attempted to create a unified system for understanding the human intellect and the universe which would provide an explanation of and a guide for human behavior.

Posidonius wrote on physics (including meteorology and physical geography), astronomy, astrology and divination, seismology, geology and mineralogy, hydrology, botany, ethics, logic, mathematics, history, natural history, anthropology, and tactics. His studies were major investigations into their subjects, although not without errors.

None of his works survives intact. All that have been found are fragments, although the titles and subjects of many of his books are known. Writers such as Strabo and Seneca provide most of the information about his life and works.

== Philosophy ==
For Posidonius, philosophy was the dominant master art and all the individual sciences were subordinate to philosophy, which alone could explain the cosmos. All his works, from scientific to historical, were inseparably philosophical.

He accepted the Stoic categorization of philosophy into physics (natural philosophy, including metaphysics and theology), logic (including dialectic), and ethics. These three categories for him were, in Stoic fashion, inseparable and interdependent parts of an organic, natural whole. He compared them to a living being, with physics the flesh and blood, logic the bones and tendons holding the organism together, and finally ethics—the most important part—corresponding to the soul.

Although a firm Stoic, Posidonius was syncretic like Panaetius and other Stoics of the middle period. He followed not only the earlier Stoics, but made use of the writings of Plato and Aristotle. Posidonius studied Plato's Timaeus, and seems to have written a commentary on it emphasizing its Pythagorean features. As a creative philosopher, Posidonius would however be expected to create innovations within the tradition of the philosophical school to which he belonged. David Sedley remarks:

On the vast majority of philosophical issues, what we know of both Panaetius and Posidonius places them firmly within the main current of Stoic debate. Their innovatively hospitable attitude to Plato and Aristotle enables them to enrich and, to a limited extent, reorientate their inherited Stoicism, but, for all that, they remain palpably Stoics, working within the established tradition.

=== Ethics ===
Ethics, Posidonius taught, is about practice not just theory. It involves knowledge of both the human and the divine, and a knowledge of the universe to which human reason is related.

It was once the general view that Posidonius departed from the monistic psychology of the earlier Stoics. Chrysippus had written a work called On Passions in which he affirmed that reason and emotion were not separate and distinct faculties, and that destructive passions were instead rational impulses which were out-of-control. According to the testimony of Galen (an adherent of Plato), Posidonius wrote his own On Passions in which he instead adopted Plato's tripartition of the soul which taught that in addition to the rational faculties, the human soul had faculties that were spirited (anger, desires for power, possessions, etc.) and desiderative (desires for sex and food). Although Galen's testimony is still accepted by some, more recent scholarship argues that Galen may have exaggerated Posidonius' views for polemical effect, and that Posidonius may have been trying to clarify and expand on Chrysippus rather than oppose him. Other writers who knew the ethical works of Posidonius, including Cicero and Seneca, grouped Chrysippus and Posidonius together and saw no opposition between them.

=== Physics ===
The philosophical grand vision of Posidonius was that the universe itself was interconnected as an organic whole, providential and organised in all respects, from the development of the physical world to the behaviour of living creatures. Panaetius had doubted both the reality of divination and the Stoic doctrine of the future conflagration (ekpyrosis), but Posidonius wrote in favour of these ideas. As a Stoic, Posidonius was an advocate of cosmic "sympathy" (συμπάθεια, sympatheia)—the organic interrelation of all appearances in the world, from the sky to the Earth, as part of a rational design uniting humanity and all things in the universe. He believed valid predictions could be made from signs in nature—whether through astrology or prophetic dreams—as a kind of scientific prediction.

=== Mathematics ===
Posidonius was one of the first to attempt to prove Euclid's fifth postulate of geometry. He suggested changing the definition of parallel straight lines to an equivalent statement that would allow him to prove the fifth postulate. From there, Euclidean geometry could be restructured, placing the fifth postulate among the theorems instead.

In addition to his writings on geometry, Posidonius was credited for creating some mathematical definitions, or for articulating views on technical terms, for example 'theorem' and 'problem'.

=== Astronomy and meteorology ===
Some fragments of his writings on astronomy survive through the treatise by Cleomedes, On the Circular Motions of the Celestial Bodies, the first chapter of the second book appearing to have been mostly copied from Posidonius.

Posidonius advanced the theory that the Sun emanated a vital force that permeated the world.

He attempted to measure the distance and size of the Sun. In about 90 BC, Posidonius estimated the distance from the Earth to the Sun (see astronomical unit) to be 9,893 times the Earth's radius. This was still too small by half. In measuring the size of the Sun, however, he reached a figure larger and more accurate than those proposed by other Greek astronomers and Aristarchus of Samos.

Posidonius also calculated the size and distance of the Moon.

Posidonius constructed an orrery, possibly similar to the Antikythera mechanism. Posidonius's orrery, according to Cicero, exhibited the diurnal motions of the Sun, Moon, and the five known planets.

Posidonius in his writings on meteorology followed Aristotle. He theorized on the causes of clouds, mist, wind, and rain as well as frost, hail, lightning, and rainbows. He also estimated that the boundary between the clouds and the heavens lies about 40 stadia above the Earth.

=== Geography, ethnology, and geology ===
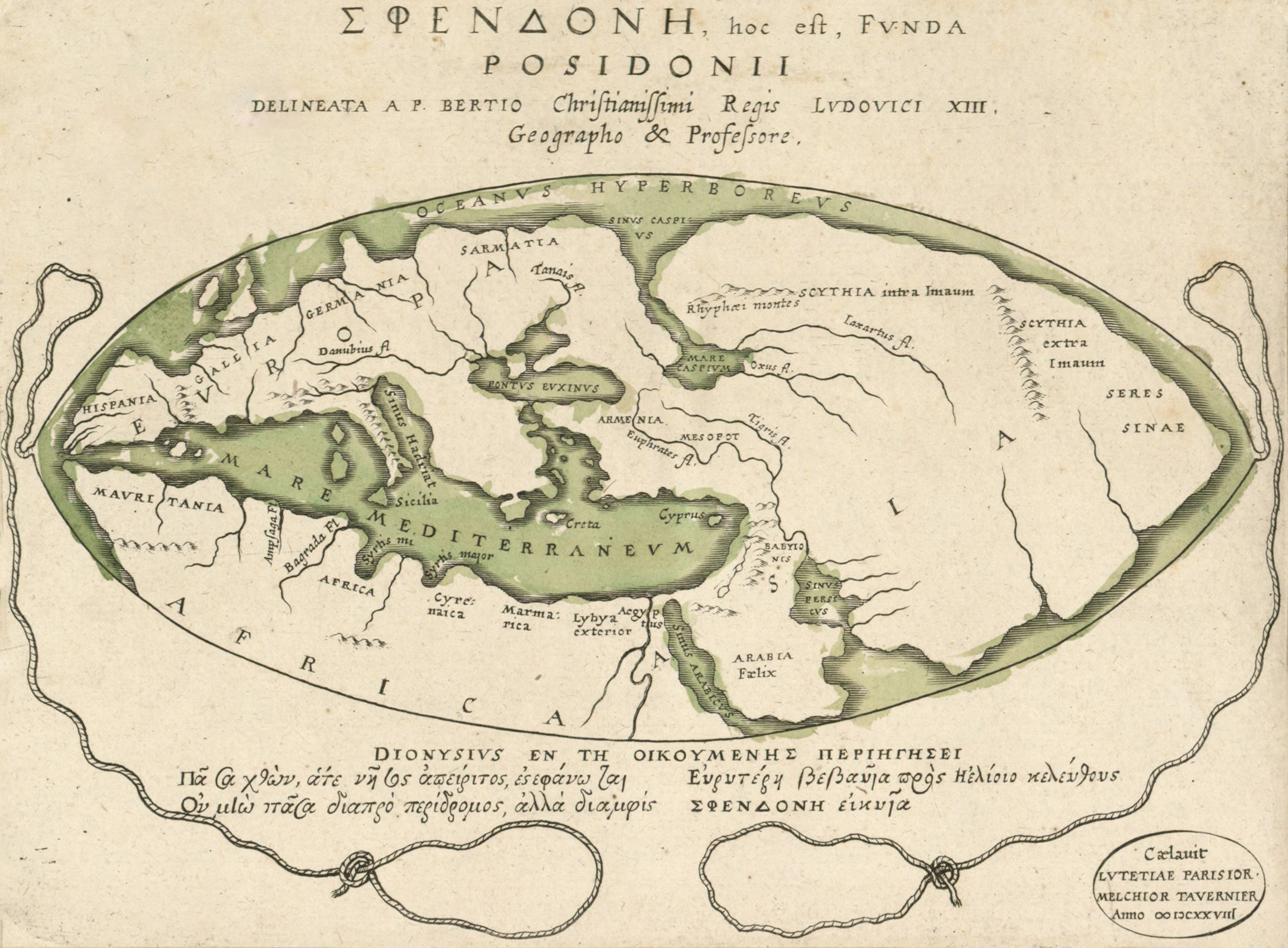
World map according to ideas by Posidonius (150–130 BC), drawn in 1628 by cartographers Petrus Bertius and Melchior Tavernier. Many of the details could not have been known to Posidonius; rather, Bertius and Tavernier show Posidonius's ideas about the positions of the continents.

Posidonius's fame beyond specialized philosophical circles had begun, at the latest, in the eighties with the publication of the work "About the ocean and the adjacent areas". This work was not only an overall representation of geographical questions according to current scientific knowledge, but it served to popularize his theories about the internal connections of the world, to show how all the forces had an effect on each other and how the interconnectedness applied also to human life, to the political just as to the personal spheres.

In this work, Posidonius detailed his theory of the effect on a people's character by the climate, which included his representation of the "geography of the races". This theory was not solely scientific, but also had political implications—his Roman readers were informed that the climatic central position of Italy was an essential condition of the Roman destiny to dominate the world. As a Stoic, he did not, however, make a fundamental distinction between the civilized Romans as masters of the world and the less civilized peoples. Posidonius's writings on the Jews were probably the source of Diodorus Siculus's account of the siege of Jerusalem and possibly also for Strabo's. Some of Posidonius's arguments are contested by Josephus in Against Apion.

Like Pytheas, Posidonius believed the tide is caused by the Moon. Posidonius was, however, wrong about the cause. Thinking that the Moon was a mixture of air and fire, he attributed the cause of the tides to the heat of the Moon, hot enough to cause the water to swell but not hot enough to evaporate it.

He recorded observations on both earthquakes and volcanoes, including accounts of the eruptions of the volcanoes in the Aeolian Islands, north of Sicily.

==== Earth's circumference ====
Posidonius calculated the Earth's circumference by the arc measurement method, by reference to the position of the star Canopus. As explained by Cleomedes, Posidonius observed Canopus on but never above the horizon at Rhodes, while at Alexandria he saw it ascend as far as 7½ degrees above the horizon (the meridian arc between the latitude of the two locales is actually 5 degrees 14 minutes). Since he thought Rhodes was 5,000 stadia due north of Alexandria, and the difference in the star's elevation indicated the distance between the two locales was 1/48 of the circle, he multiplied 5,000 stadia by 48 to arrive at a figure of 240,000 stadia for the circumference of the Earth.

His estimate of the latitude difference of these two points, 360 degrees/48=7.5 degrees, is rather erroneous. (The modern value is approximately 5 degrees.) In addition, they are not quite on the same meridian as they were assumed to be. The longitude difference of the points, slightly less than 2 degrees, is not negligible compared with the latitude difference.

Translating stadia into modern units of distance can be problematic, but it is generally thought that the stadion used by Posidonius was almost exactly 1/10 of a modern statute mile. Thus Posidonius's measure of 240,000 stadia translates to 24,000 mi (39,000 km) compared to the actual circumference of 24,901 mi (40,074 km).

Posidonius's method for calculating the circumference of the Earth relied on the altitude of the star Canopus.

Posidonius was informed in his approach to finding the Earth's circumference by Eratosthenes, who a century earlier arrived at a figure of 252,000 stadia; both men's figures for the Earth's circumference were uncannily accurate.

Strabo noted that the distance between Rhodes and Alexandria is 3,750 stadia, and reported Posidonius's estimate of the Earth's circumference to be 180,000 stadia or 18,000 mi (29,000 km). Pliny the Elder mentions Posidonius among his sources and without naming him reported his method for estimating the Earth's circumference. He noted, however, that Hipparchus had added some 26,000 stadia to Eratosthenes's estimate. The smaller value offered by Strabo and the different lengths of Greek and Roman stadia have created a persistent confusion around Posidonius's result. Ptolemy used Posidonius's lower value of 180,000 stades (about 16% too low) for the Earth's circumference in his Geography. This was the number used by Christopher Columbus to underestimate the distance to India as 70,000 stades.

=== History and tactics ===
In his Histories, Posidonius continued the World History of Polybius. His history of the period 146–88 BC is said to have filled 52 volumes. His Histories continue the account of the rise and expansion of Roman dominance, which he appears to have supported. Posidonius did not follow Polybius's more detached and factual style, for Posidonius saw events as caused by human psychology; while he understood human passions and follies, he did not pardon or excuse them in his historical writing, using his narrative skill in fact to enlist the readers' approval or condemnation.

For Posidonius "history" extended beyond the earth into the sky; humanity was not isolated each in its own political history, but was a part of the cosmos. His Histories were not, therefore, concerned with isolated political history of peoples and individuals, but they included discussions of all forces and factors (geographical factors, mineral resources, climate, nutrition), which let humans act and be a part of their environment. For example, Posidonius considered the climate of Arabia and the life-giving strength of the sun, tides (taken from his book on the oceans), and climatic theory to explain people's ethnic or national characters.

Of Posidonius's work on tactics, The Art of War, the Greek historian Arrian complained that it was written 'for experts', which suggests that Posidonius may have had first hand experience of military leadership or, perhaps, used knowledge he gained from his acquaintance with Pompey.

== Reputation and influence ==
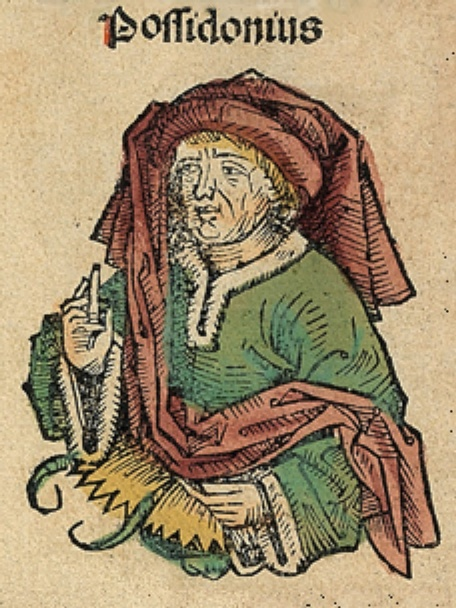
Posidonius, depicted as a medieval scholar in the Nuremberg Chronicle

In his own era, his writings on almost all the principal divisions of philosophy made Posidonius a renowned international figure throughout the Graeco-Roman world and he was widely cited by writers of his era, including Cicero, Livy, Plutarch, Strabo (who called Posidonius "the most learned of all philosophers of my time"), Cleomedes, Seneca the Younger, Diodorus Siculus (who used Posidonius as a source for his Bibliotheca Historia ["Historical Library"]), and others. Although his ornate and rhetorical style of writing passed out of fashion soon after his death, Posidonius was acclaimed during his life for his literary ability and as a stylist.

Posidonius was the major source of materials on the Celts of Gaul and was profusely quoted by Timagenes, Julius Caesar, the Sicilian Greek Diodorus Siculus, and the Greek geographer Strabo.

Posidonius appears to have moved with ease among the upper echelons of Roman society as an ambassador from Rhodes. He associated with some of the leading figures of late republican Rome, including Cicero and Pompey, both of whom visited him in Rhodes. In his twenties, Cicero attended his lectures (77 BC) and they continued to correspond. Cicero in his De Finibus closely followed Posidonius's presentation of Panaetius's ethical teachings.

Posidonius met Pompey when he was Rhodes's ambassador in Rome and Pompey visited him in Rhodes twice, once in 66 BC during his campaign against the pirates and again in 62 BC during his eastern campaigns, and asked Posidonius to write his biography. As a gesture of respect and great honor, Pompey lowered his fasces before Posidonius's door. Other Romans who visited Posidonius in Rhodes were Velleius, Cotta, and Lucilius.

Ptolemy was impressed by the sophistication of Posidonius's methods, which included correcting for the refraction of light passing through denser air near the horizon. Ptolemy's approval of Posidonius's result, rather than Eratosthenes's earlier and more correct figure, caused it to become the accepted value for the Earth's circumference for the next 1,500 years.

Posidonius fortified the Stoicism of the middle period with contemporary learning. Next to his teacher Panaetius, he did most, by writings and personal contacts, to spread Stoicism in the Roman world. A century later, Seneca referred to Posidonius as one of those who had made the largest contribution to philosophy.

His influence on Greek philosophical thinking lasted until the Middle Ages, as is demonstrated by the large number of times he is cited as a source in the Suda (a 10th-century Byzantine encyclopedia).

Wilhelm Capelle traced most of the doctrines of the popular philosophic treatise De Mundo to Posidonius. Today, Posidonius seems to be recognized as having had an inquiring and wide-ranging mind, not entirely original, but with a breadth of view that connected, in accordance with his underlying Stoic philosophy, all things and their causes and all knowledge into an overarching, unified world view.

The crater Posidonius on the Moon is named after him.

== Editions and translations ==
- Kidd, I. G.; Edelstein, Ludwig (1972). Posidonius. I. The Fragments. Cambridge University Press. ISBN 0521080460.
- Kidd, I. G. (1988). Posidonius. II. The Commentary. Cambridge University Press. ISBN 0521200628.
- Kidd, I. G. (1999). Posidonius. III. The Translation of the Fragments. Cambridge University Press. ISBN 0521622581.

== See also ==
- Historic recurrence
- Twin study

== Sources ==
- Chisholm, Hugh, ed. (1911). "Posidonius" . Encyclopædia Britannica. Vol. 22 (11th ed.). Cambridge University Press. p. 172.
- Bevan, Edwyn. Stoics and Skeptics, 1913. ISBN 0890053642
- Graver, Margaret (2002). "Appendix D: Posidonius". Cicero on the Emotions. Tusculan Disputations 3 and 4. University of Chicago Press. ISBN 0226305783.
- Harley, J. B. & Woodward, David. The History of Cartography, Volume 1: Cartography in Prehistoric, Ancient, and Medieval Europe and the Mediterranean, 1987, pp. 168–170. ISBN 0226316335 (v. 1)
- Juergen Malitz, Poseidonios from Grosse Gestalten der griechischen Antike. 58 historische Portraits von Homer bis Kleopatra. Hrsg. von Kai Brodersen. München: Verlag C.H. Beck. S. 426–432.
- Sedley, David (2003). "The School, from Zeno to Arius Didymus". In Inwood, Brad (ed.). The Cambridge Companion to the Stoics. Cambridge University Press. ISBN 0521779855.
- Sellars, John (2006). Stoicism. Acumen. ISBN 978-1844650521.
- Magill, Frank Northen; Aves, Alison (1998). Dictionary of World Biography. Taylor & Francis. pp. 904–910. ISBN 978-1579580407.
