= Toomer =

Toomer is a surname. Notable people with the surname include:

- Barbara Toomer (1929–2018), American advocate for disability rights
- Amani Toomer, football player formerly with the New York Giants
- Fred A. Toomer, Third Vice-President and member of the Board of Directors of Atlanta Life Insurance Company
- Gerald J. Toomer, historian of astronomy and mathematics
- Jean Toomer, American poet of the Harlem Renaissance
- Sheldon Toomer, American politician and businessman
- Ron Toomer (1930–2011), American roller coaster designer
- Walter Toomer (1883–1962), English footballer

== See also ==
- Toomer, an abbreviation for Fred A. Toomer Elementary School in Atlanta, Georgia
