= Hipparchus (disambiguation) =

Hipparchus, the common Latinization of the Greek Hipparkhos, can mean:

- Hipparchus, the ancient Greek astronomer
  - Hipparchic cycle, an astronomical cycle he created
  - Hipparchus (lunar crater), a lunar crater named in his honour
  - Hipparchus (Martian crater), a crater on Mars named in his honour
  - 4000 Hipparchus, an asteroid named in his honour
  - Hipparcos, an astrometry space mission named in his honour
- Hipparchus (cavalry officer), commander of one hipparchia
- Hipparchus (brother of Hippias), brother of Athenian tyrant Hippias
- Hipparchus of Euboea, an ancient Euboean tyrant
- Hipparchus (poet), an ancient Greek actor from Corinth
- Tiberius Claudius Hipparchus, a prominent Athenian statesman of the mid-1st century CE
- Hipparchus (dialogue), a dialogue ascribed to Plato
