= Manitius =

Manitius is a surname. Notable people by that name include:

- Max Manitius (1858–1933), German medievalist and Latin scholar
- Karl Manitius (1899–1979), German historian
