= Capitol Crawl =

1990 disability rights protest

- Part of Disability rights movement
- Date: March 12,1990
- Location: United States Capitol

Parties
ADAPT

The Capitol Crawl was a disability rights protest on March 12, 1990, in support of the passage of the Americans with Disabilities Act of 1990 (ADA). It was organized by ADAPT, a grassroots disability rights organization. Following a march from the White House to the U.S. Capitol Building, several activists left their mobility aids at the base of the Capitol and crawled or dragged themselves up the steps of the building. The event attracted significant media attention and is often considered a landmark moment in disability rights history.

== Background ==
During the 1980s, ADAPT (which, at the time, stood for American Disabled for Accessible Public Transit) organized with the goal of empowering disabled Americans to engage in direct action. The movement grew out of a changing attitude toward disability - away from paternalism, and towards full representation in society. Although ADAPT's ideas received significant support, it was generally regarded as a fringe organization due to their embrace of direct action tactics. Taking inspiration from the Civil Rights Movement, ADAPT was active in civil disobedience for accessibility, particularly on municipal buses.

Following the Rehabilitation Act of 1973, many disability rights activists saw a need for more expansive legislation to establish civil rights for disabled Americans. In September 1989, the ADA was passed with wide bipartisan support by the Senate, but was perceived as moving slowly through committees in the House of Representatives. Although the bill was making gradual progress, it also faced significant challenges. For example, the Bush administration hesitated to implement strict penalties against businesses which did not comply with the legislation.

== The "crawl-up" ==
In response to perceived delays in the passage of the ADA, ADAPT organized a "Wheels of Justice" march for March 12, 1990. Beginning at the White House, hundreds of protestors marched toward the West Front of the Capitol. This was a large protest in the scope of the disability rights movement, as accessibility issues prevented many disabled Americans from participating in large-scale action.

At the base of the Capitol, several disability rights activists spoke in support of the ADA, including I. King Jordan and Justin Dart Jr. After the speeches, protestors began chanting “What do we want?” “ADA!” “When do we want it?” “NOW!” In a planned demonstration, dozens of disabled protestors left their mobility aids and began moving up the steps toward the entrance to the Capitol. Each protestor carried a scroll containing the opening words of the Declaration of Independence.

=== Jennifer Keelan-Chaffins ===
One of the activists in the "crawl-up" was eight-year-old Jennifer Keelan-Chaffins, who attended her first ADAPT protest at the age of six. Keelan-Chaffins, who had cerebral palsy, was having difficulty climbing the steps, stopping multiple times to ask for water. However, she was met with enormous support from the onlooking crowd. Michael Winter, another participant in the "crawl-up," said that he felt an obligation to be a role model for Keelan-Chaffins, motivating him to reach the top of the stairs. At one point, Keelan-Chaffins said, "I'll take all night, if I have to."

Photographs of Keelan-Chaffins became some of the most noted images of the protest, garnering attention from the media.

== Aftermath ==
The day after the "crawl-up," ADAPT organized a sit-in. The group scheduled its members for a "tour" of the Capitol, intending to stage a demonstration in the Rotunda, usually filled with tourists. ADAPT members demanded to speak to leaders in the House of Representatives, and chained themselves together. The demonstrators were addressed by Tom Foley, Robert H. Michel, and Steny Hoyer, before police arrested the participants. The police escorted each demonstrator through a single elevator, which took two hours to complete.

On July 26, 1990, the Americans With Disabilities Act was signed into law by President George H. W. Bush.

== Impact ==
Analysis of the impact of the event is mixed. Although some media coverage and scholarship credits the protest with getting the ADA out of Congressional gridlock, others argue that the ADA was already making progress in Congress.

James Weismann, a transportation accessibility lobbyist, argues that, "The day they were crawling up the steps, the ADA was passing. It didn’t matter whether they crawled up the steps or not," although he later acknowledged that "I didn’t realize how significant it was. It was completely wasted on me.... Their demonstrating was more self-empowering than it was constructive when it came to the legislation. But it was effective in the sense that you need warm bodies that legislators have to see."

At the time, ADAPT's action faced some criticism from supporters of the ADA and disability rights. Senator Bob Dole, who was disabled as a result of injuries from his service in World War II, was a vocal advocate of the ADA. As he walked past ADAPT's sit-in at the Capitol rotunda, he said, "This doesn't help us any." Others expressed concerns that the "crawl-up" would convey a message that they were trying to fight against: that disabled people were pitiable and childlike.

Mary Johnson, editor of The Disability Rag, criticized the demonstration as a whole and the focus on Keelan-Chaffins, saying, "One might question why a movement intent on showing that disabled people are adults, not children, would make their central media image a child? One might wonder why people who repeatedly complain that TV and newspapers report on them only as courageous, overcoming barriers, were grunting up steps while reporters were asking them if they felt like heroes?”

Michael Winter, a participant in the protests, argued that that, "Some people may have thought that it was undignified for people in wheelchairs to crawl in that manner, but I felt that it was necessary to show the country what kinds of things people with disabilities have to face on a day-to-day basis. We had to be willing to fight for what we believed in."

In the days and weeks after the protests, several newspapers covered the event, although it was not regarded as a watershed moment. Media coverage emphasized the agency of the activists; a New York Times article published on March 18, 1990 was headlined, "The Disabled Find a Voice, And Make Sure It Is Heard."

In the decades since, the Capitol Crawl has become recognized as a landmark moment in disability rights history. Lex Frieden, a policy expert who worked on the ADA, says that, "I think on that day and at that time, more people learned about disability discrimination and equal opportunity than we can imagine."

The "crawl-up" highlighted barriers of inaccessibility, because the Capitol building is known as the "people's house". Hanraie writes that, "this building, a symbol of governance and democratic citizenship for all — an embodiment of the nation itself — was not designed with disabled people in mind." Davis says that, "You can’t watch that without being well aware of the difficulties of people with disabilities when they confront obstacles like stairs.”

The event is often credited with shaping perspectives on disability. In Building Access: Universal Design and the Politics of Disability, disability design researcher Aimi Hamraie argues that the protest "demonstrated the power of disabled people as resourceful agents whose novel tactics showed visible evidence of disability discrimination, rather than patients in need of medical cure." ADAPT's protests also empowered disabled activists, impacting future action.

Lennard J. Davis, author of Enabling Acts: The Hidden Story of How the Americans with Disabilities Act Gave the Largest U.S. Minority Its Rights, writes that, "The importance of these events to building disability identity and consciousness cannot be underestimated." Michael Auberger, a participant in the protests, recalls that, "Somewhere in there, with all the energy that was expended, it just put everybody right there on the edge of, in touch with, their anger, in touch with a lot of history about access. All the years of oppression seemed to come out right then and there."
