= Wade Blank =

The ADAPT flag for disability rights

Wade Blank (1940–1993) was an American Presbyterian minister and a leader of the modern disability rights movement. Building on his experiences in the 1960s and 1970s Civil Rights Movement, Blank pioneered the use of nonviolent direct action to transition individuals with disabilities from nursing homes to independent living, co-founding the Atlantis Community in 1975. He led Denver disability rights protests including the 1978 "Gang of 19" bus blockade in the city, and later was a co-founder of ADAPT. Blank’s grassroots organizing efforts are credited with shifting national policy and clearing the way for the Americans with Disabilities Act of 1990.

== Activism ==
Originally a Presbyterian minister and a veteran of the 1960s Black civil rights movement, having marched with Dr. Martin Luther King Jr. in Selma, Blank changed his focus to disability advocacy after witnessing the systemic oppression, dehumanization and isolation of individuals within nursing homes. In 1975, he co-founded the Atlantis Community in Denver, Colorado, an organization dedicated to helping people with severe disabilities transition from institutionalized settings to independent living through his concept of the "liberated community."

Blank is perhaps best known as the founder of ADAPT, (American Disabled for Accessible Public Transit) a grassroots organization that revolutionized disability activism through militant direct action and many forms of civil disobedience. His strategic leadership gained renown with the 1978 "Gang of 19" protest, when activists immobilized Denver buses to demand wheelchair lifts—a tactic that thrust the movement into the legislative spotlight. Under his guidance, ADAPT's confrontational and persistent methods led to the eventual passage of the Americans with Disabilities Act (ADA) in 1990.

Beyond his effective tactics for grabbing the public’s attention, Blank was noted for his “unpretentious” leadership, often performing personal care for fellow activists while on the road to uphold a sense of shared struggle and humility. He tragically died in 1993 while attempting to rescue his son from a rip current in Mexico. Blank's legacy continues through the ongoing modern work of ADAPT and the countless leaders he mentored, who continue to fight for the fundamental right of all people to live with dignity and independence in their own communities.

More recently, an application to rename Civic Center Station to Wade Blank Civic Center station was submitted, and the RTD committee voted unanimously to approve the renaming, which officially took effect on January 19, 2026.

== His life and reasons for change ==
Blank was born in Pittsburgh in 1940 but began his career in the 1960s at McCormick Theological Seminary when he was training to become a Presbyterian minister. In 1965, Blank traveled down to Selma, Alabama to march alongside Dr. Martin Luther King Jr., and this served as his progressive awakening, turning him radically to the side of social justice. By the late 1960s, Blank had become a Presbyterian minister in Akron, Ohio, and he invested much of his time into the anti-war movement during the Vietnam War. Using the resources of the church and its greater community, Blank supported the Students for a Democratic Society (SDS) at Kent State and was involved with helping draft resisters. Due to this advocacy, he was terminated as a Presbyterian minister after FBI pressure, and he moved in Denver in 1971 to work as an orderly at the nursing home Heritage House.

At Heritage House, Blank worked in the Youth Wing that housed dozens of young people who had severe disabilities and were effectively imprisoned by institutional bureaucracy and the general culture of unwillingness to deal with disabled individuals in public. Blank was repulsed that the young people were "consigned to waiting for death" in a place he described as "like a morgue". In 1974, this injustice inspired Blank to disobey his role as an administrator and organize a sit-in at the Colorado State Capitol to protest their living conditions. After this, Heritage House fired him for his disruption, and Blank helped eighteen residents "break out" of the facility to live in their own apartments and feel a newfound sense of independence. In 1975, Blank helped found the Atlantis Community, serving as a model for independent living that prioritized autonomy over medical supervision that prohibited it.

July of 1978 marked the change of the Atlantis Community from focusing on the struggle for independent housing to the struggle for disabled mobility when Blank coordinated the "Gang of 19" protest, a two-day standoff where activists blocked Denver buses––which were, at the time, inaccessible to individuals in wheelchairs—at Colfax and Broadway. This protest resulted in a local victory for the disability rights movement at large, and with newfound support growing, Blank co-founded ADAPT in 1983 to expand his fight nationally. For the following decade, Blank worked as the ADAPT strategist and backbone. In February of 1993, while on vacation in Mexico, Blank drowned after successfully rescuing his son from a rip current.
