= The Disability Rag =

US magazine

- Mastheads used 1980-2003
- Editor: Mary Johnson
- Former editors: Dave Matheis, Barrett Shaw, Eric Francis
- Frequency: Monthly or bi-monthly
- Circulation: 6,000 maximum
- Publisher: The Advocado Press, Inc.
- Founder: Mary Johnson, Cass Irvin
- Founded: 1980; 46 years ago
- Final issue: 2004; 22 years ago
- Country: United States
- Based in: Louisville
- ISSN: 0749-8586

The Disability Rag (also known as Ragged Edge magazine) was a periodical published between 1980 and 2004 as a subscription-based print publication, and as an online publication from 1997 to 2007. In addition to covering the U. S. disability rights movement, The Rag, as it was usually called, published a wide range of articles and opinion pieces from individuals with disabilities. It was considered one of the most important publications of the disability rights movement. The not-for-profit Advocado Press was incorporated in 1981 to serve as publisher of The Rag. The Advocado Press also published a number of books and monographs on disability issues.

== Early history ==
The Disability Rag's first issue was a four-page bifold produced at a quick-print shop and published in January, 1980 in Louisville KY, with both news items for the local disability activism community in Louisville and a first-person account of "living like a refugee" as a person with a disability. The publication was the effort of two Louisville women who were active in local disability organizations: Cass Irvin, a polio survivor who believed that "there needed to be some way for [disabled] people to connect" and Mary Johnson, who was non-disabled and had a background in public relations. In 1994 Irvin was cited as one of 50 "American Heroines" by the Ladies Home Journal, in part for her work with The Rag. After a few years The Rag began to get national attention due to the efforts of Irvin, who was active in the American Coalition of Citizens with Disabilities (ACCD).

== Content ==
Cover of the January, 1987 issue.

The Disability Rag's national growth was accelerated in 1985 by a front page Wall Street Journal article. As it became a national periodical of the disability movement, it addressed the disability community's concerns about both personal and public issues. The Rag was a hybrid: both a news magazine, with coverage of emerging activism local and nationwide, and an opinion journal. In an era before social media, its articles by leading disability rights figures and a large and lively letters to the editor section debated the disability rights policy issues of the times as activists proposed, argued about and worked out ideology and strategies. The Rag covered the full range of disability political issues from charity telethons to physician assisted suicide to protests over inaccessible public transit. When ADAPT started a national activist effort to change public transit policy, The Rag provided continuing coverage of the activists and the issue, and the coverage was collected and published as To Ride the Public's Buses: The Fight that Built A Movement, The Advocado Press's first "Disability Rag Reader."

'Disability Rat Rides Again'

Another ongoing issue for The Rag was media coverage: it consistently railed against or poked fun at what it considered detrimental or misguided coverage of disabled people. Two ongoing features of the magazine — "Myth & Media" and "We Wish We Wouldn't See..." — critiqued the typical coverage of disabled people as either heroes and "overcomers" or victims of disease, and skewered ads for cosmetic surgery or from fundraising charities which used disability as tragedy to open purse strings.

It urged readers to view themselves not as victims of tragedy but survivors facing discrimination and barriers, which could be removed by society. It urged its readers to wake up to the fact that their lives could be better without cures if they would just fight for access and accommodation. The recurring cartoon feature "Disability Rat," kept up the theme. The Wall Street Journal told readers about the "wheelchair-riding rodent who, irked at having his handicapped-parking space swiped, blows up the offending vehicle." And The Rag was not shy about pointing out the value of its ideology: "Start Reading The Rag and start to think" was a slogan of early subscription ads.

== Role in self-identity and culture ==
The Rag served as a national forum as activists and leading thinkers and scholars of disability rights submitted articles and reacted to items and reader letters published in The Rag, and it grew to become an important outlet for creative expressions of disability culture, including essays, fiction, poetry and artwork reflecting the experience of disability. (In 1994 The Advocado Press issued an anthology of much of this writing as The Ragged Edge anthology.). Mike Ervin, reviewing the book in The Progressive magazine, called The Rag "the gimp-radical's bible."

Many disabled people first learned about disability culture through The Disability Rag, including Stephen E Brown, who wrote that "The Disability Rag published stories by kindred spirits" and noted that he "wanted to write for it one day."

Bob Ruffner, then the director of public affairs for the President's Committee on Employment of People with Disabilities, called The Rag "a strong voice for those who may not be associated with a lot of well-organized groups.

"It's very forceful in arguing that disabled people should get their heads out of the clouds and confront society with their needs," he said, adding that "utopian ideas - ideas that can be translated into social action - start in places like The Rag.

"How else can you build a movement among people who have been left out? Its purpose is to build a fire," he told The Washington Post in 1986.

== Criticisms ==
The Rag was considered "well left of center on the political spectrum." Because of its "take no prisoners" tone, The Rag was frequently criticized. Some felt its "strident, shoot from the hip approach" was counterproductive; that its accusatory tone diminished the impact of its message. Other readers complained that it lacked humor.

Cover of the July 1981 issue

Many had serious reservations about the ferocity of its disability pride message, which they felt went too far when it eschewed the concept of cure. The fact that The Rag celebrated disability to the extent that it frequently took stances against charity appeals for cures, such as telethons, rubbed critics the wrong way.

And because The Rag was not loath to call out those in the disability movement whom it considered "Uncle Tiny Tims" or opinions of leaders that it considered bad disability politics, disability movement activists fumed when they found themselves in firing range.

== Growth and changes ==
As The Rag's reach grew, it hired a circulation manager and acquired an office. By 1990, The Advocado Press employed several staff members, for both editorial and circulation, for The Rag.

Mary Johnson, The Rag's longtime editor, left in 1993 and the editorship passed to Dave Matheis. Barrett Shaw took over as editor in 1994, to be succeeded by Eric Francis in 1996. In 1997, Johnson returned as editor and remained in that position until print publication ceased at the end of 2004.

In 1989 The Disability Rag changed its masthead to The Disability Rag and Resource, and in 1995 changed its name to Ragged Edge magazine at the launch of its website, Ragged Edge Online. It began experimenting with color covers, and grew to around 6,000 paying subscribers.

Fundraising efforts by its nonprofit Advocado Press starting in the mid-1980s resulted in a number of financial gifts both from longtime members and various progressive and activist groups. The Advocado Press received grants for its work on media and disability.

The Advocado Press published Reporting on Disability: Approaches and Issues (1989) Strange People with Books (by Nancy Gall-Clayton, 1990), and Media Savvy: A Self-Training Curriculum (1991), as The Rag's coverage of the "bus battle' was later anthologized in the Advocado Press first Disability Rag Reader, To Ride the Public's Buses: The Fight that Built A Movement

The Ragged Edge magazine published as a periodical through 2003. In 2004, the Advocado Press published three larger issues called "Ragged Edge Readers" and at the end of 2004 ceased print publication, although the Ragged Edge Online website continued to feature new material for two more years. The complete Ragged Edge Online site is available through archive.org.

== Awards and recognitions ==
In 1993 The Disability Rag won the Utne Reader Alternative Press Award for Best Special Interest Publication: The magazine was "cogent, outspoken, and joyfully resistant to stereotyping, its pages feature scathing satire and clearheaded thinking," according to Utne.

In 1998 The Ragged Edge anthology was named an "outstanding book on the subject of human rights in North America" by the Gustavus Myers Center for the Study of Human Rights.

== Online presence ==
The Ragged Edge website launched in 1997 as "The Electric Edge" before settling on "Ragged Edge Online." Besides offering digital editions of the print publication, the Rag website offered news updates and expanded discussion of trending topics in the disability rights movement, and blog posts by disability activists.

== Archive ==
A complete list of Advocado Press titles still in print can be found online. Its complete periodical archive and many of its titles are available online from Alexander Street Press. In 2015, the organizational papers and archives of The Advocado Press including the periodical archives were acquired by the Bancroft Library.
