= Gerald J. Toomer =

British astronomy and mathematics historian (born 1934)

- Born: 23 November 1934 (age 91); Aldershot, Hampshire

Academic work
- Discipline: History of science
- Institutions: Brown University; Utrecht University
- Doctoral students: Jan Hogendijk

Gerald James Toomer (born 23 November 1934) is a historian of astronomy and mathematics who has written numerous books and papers on ancient Greek and medieval Islamic astronomy. In particular, he translated Ptolemy's Almagest into English.

Formerly a fellow of Corpus Christi College, Cambridge University, he moved to Brown University as a special student in 1959 to study "the history of mathematics in antiquity and the transmission of these systems through Arabic into medieval Europe." He joined the History of Mathematics department in 1963, became an associate professor in 1965, and was the chairman from 1980 to 1986.

== Some works ==
- Diocles: On Burning Mirrors. The Arabic Translation of the Lost Greek Original. ed., with English translation and commentary by G. J. Toomer. Springer, Berlin, Heidelberg, New York 1976 (Sources in the History of Mathematics and Physical Sciences, 1). ISBN 3-540-07478-3.
- Apollonius: Conics, books V to VII. The Arabic translation of the lost Greek original in the version of the Banū Mūsā. In two volumes. Ed. with transl. and commentary by G. J. Toomer. Springer, New York, Berlin, Heidelberg, Springer (Sources in the History of Mathematics and Physical Sciences, 9). ISBN 3-540-97216-1.
- "Lost Greek mathematical works in Arabic translation." Mathematical Intelligencer, volume 6, 1984, pages 32–38.
- Ptolemy's Almagest, translated and annotated by G. J. Toomer. Duckworth, London & Springer, New York 1984. ISBN 0-387-91220-7. Revised edn. Univ. Pr., Princeton, 1998, ISBN 978-0-691-00260-6.
- Hipparchus and Babylonian Astronomy. In: Erle Leichty, Maria de J. Ellis, Pamel Gerardi: A Scientific Humanist: Studies in Memory of Abraham Sachs. Philadelphia: Occasional Publications of the Samuel Noah Kramer Fund, 9, 1988.
- Eastern Wisedome and Learning. The study of Arabic in 17th century England. Oxford University Press 1996.
- John Selden. A life in scholarship. Oxford University Press, 2009.

== See also ==
- Ptolemy's table of chords
