= Fred A. Toomer =

Fred Armon Toomer (1889–1961) was Third Vice-President and member of the Board of Directors of Atlanta Life Insurance Company.

Fred A. Toomer Elementary School in Atlanta, Georgia was dedicated in his memory on April 21, 1968.
