= Equatorial ring =

Instrument to determine the moment of the equinoxes

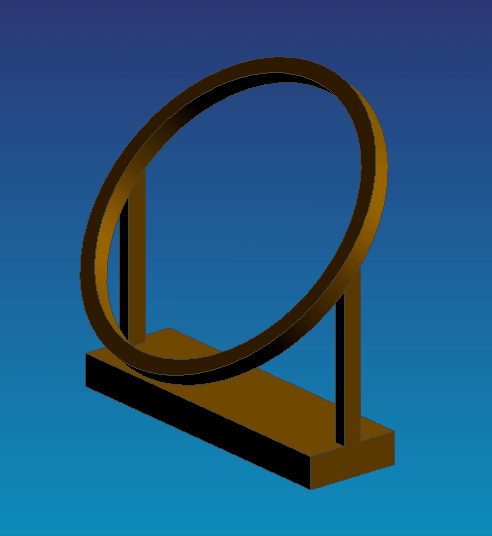
An equatorial ring

An equatorial ring was an astronomical instrument used in the Hellenistic world to determine the exact moment of the spring and autumn equinoxes. Equatorial rings were placed before the temples in Alexandria, in Rhodes, and perhaps in other places, for calendar purposes.

The easiest way to understand the use of an equatorial ring is to imagine a ring placed vertically in the east-west plane at the Earth's equator. At the time of the equinoxes, the Sun will rise precisely in the east, move across the zenith, and set precisely in the west. Throughout the day, the bottom half of the ring will be in the shadow cast by the top half of the ring. On other days of the year, the Sun passes to the north or south of the ring, and will illuminate the bottom half. For latitudes away from the equator, the ring merely needs to be placed at the correct angle to the equatorial plane. At the Earth's poles, the ring would be horizontal.

The equatorial ring was about one to two cubits (45cm–90cm) in diameter. Because the Sun is not a point source of light, the width of the shadow on the bottom half of the ring is slightly less than the width of the ring. By waiting until the shadow was centered on the ring, the time of the equinox could be fixed to within an hour or so. If the equinox happened at night, or if the sky was cloudy, an interpolation could be made between two days' measurements.

The main disadvantage with the equatorial ring is that it needed to be aligned very precisely or false measurements could occur. Ptolemy mentions in the Almagest that one of the equatorial rings in use in Alexandria had shifted slightly, which meant that the instrument showed the equinox occurring twice on the same day. False readings can also be produced by atmospheric refraction of the Sun when it is close to the horizon.

Equatorial rings can also be found on armillary spheres and equatorial sundials.
