= Barbara Toomer =

American disability rights advocate (1929–2018)

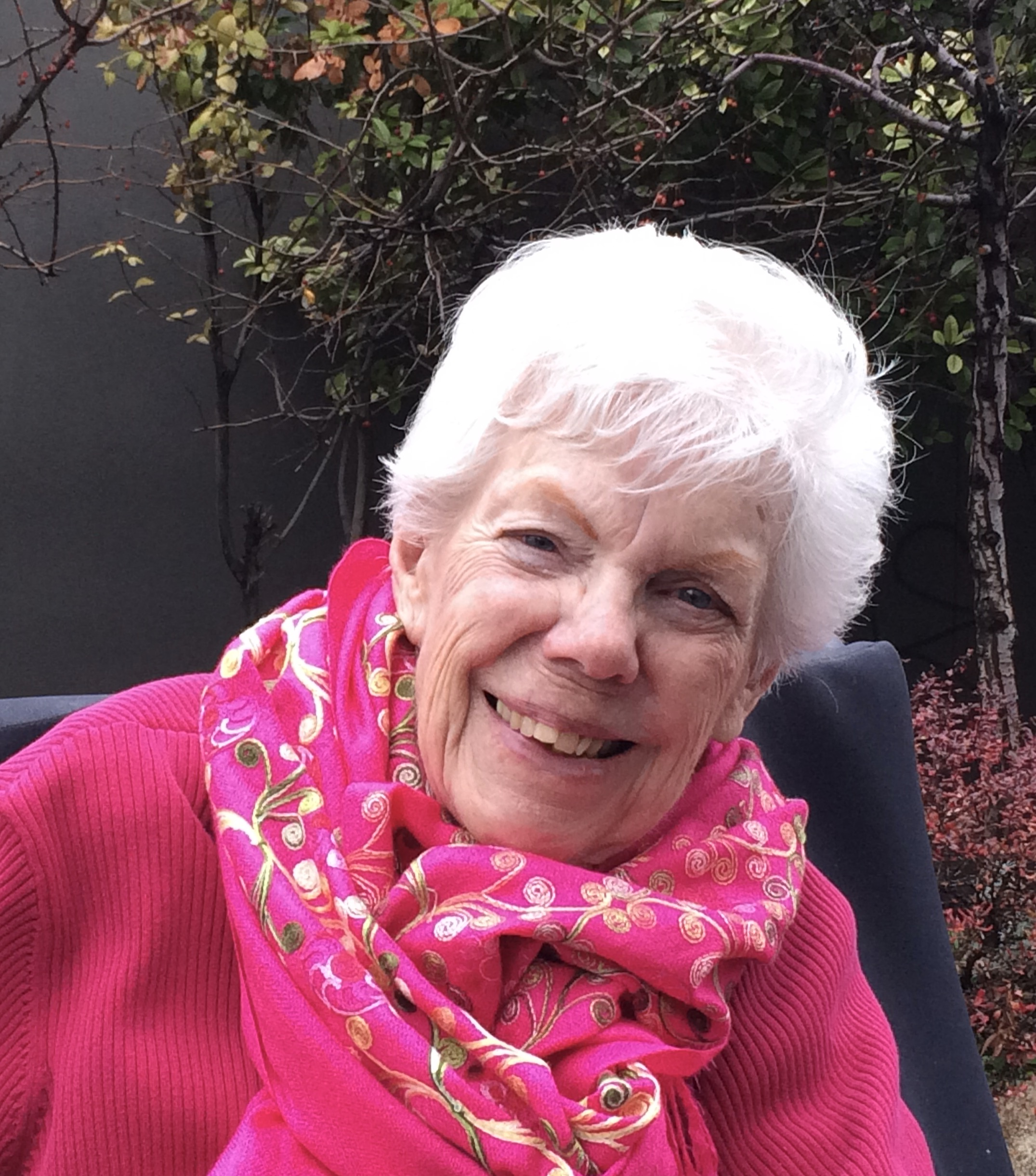
- Toomer in 2016
- Born: Barbara Greenlee; August 26, 1929; Pasadena, California, US
- Died: April 24, 2018 (aged 88); Salt Lake City, Utah, US
- Education: El Camino College; St. Joseph's College of Nursing
- Occupation(s): Nurse, activist
- Years active: 1976–2018
- Known for: Disability rights activism
- Movement: Disability rights movement
- Spouse: Gerald "Ross" Toomer
- Children: 3
- Awards: Woman of Courageous Action Award, National Organization for Women; Rosa Parks Award, Salt Lake NAACP

Barbara Greenlee Toomer (August 26, 1929 – April 24, 2018) was an American advocate for disability rights. She was born and raised in Southern California and attended nursing school in San Francisco. She then joined the United States Army Nurse Corps in 1953 and was stationed at Fort Bragg. In 1956, Toomer contracted polio and became a wheelchair user. She spent the remainder of her life advocating for disability rights in Utah. She founded and participated in multiple activist organizations, participated in protests against inaccessible transportation, and lobbied for housing freedom for disabled persons. Much of her activism involved ensuring that the Americans with Disabilities Act of 1990 (ADA) was upheld. Toomer received numerous awards for her efforts; she was awarded the Woman of Courageous Action Lifetime Achievement Award by the National Organization for Women in 2000 and the Rosa Parks Award by the Salt Lake branch of the NAACP in 2017. Toomer died in 2018 and was buried in the Utah Veterans Cemetery.

== Early life and education ==
Barbara Greenlee Toomer was born on August 26, 1929, in Pasadena, California to Samuel and Gertrude Greenlee. Her father worked in real estate, and her mother had been a secretary. She had one younger sister. The Greenlee family lived in "the back of a real estate office" during the Great Depression before moving to a family-owned ranch in Tarzana. She grew up enjoying arts and crafts—such as painting, quilting, and sewing—and participated in Girl Scouts. She attended Santa Monica High School, where she played basketball and volleyball and joined the swim team. She graduated from high school in 1947 and went on to earn an associate degree from El Camino College in 1949. Then, in 1952, she graduated from St. Joseph's College of Nursing in San Francisco, California with a bachelor's degree. After graduation, she served in the United States Army Nurse Corps between 1953 and 1955. She was ranked as a first lieutenant. In 1953, Barbara Greenlee married Gerald Ross Toomer, a captain in the army, at Fort Bragg, North Carolina. They lived in Georgia and Minnesota before moving to Salt Lake City, Utah. Barbara and Ross Toomer were married for 52 years and had three children. Speaking on the subject of her parents, Jennifer later recalled: "The two of them together made it so it never was, 'I can't.' It was, 'How are we going to do it?'"

Shortly after the birth of her first child in 1956, Toomer contracted polio. She was hospitalized for four months and required the use of a wheelchair for the remainder of her life. She then began to advocate for increased access and accommodations for disabled people.

In the 1970s, Toomer served as president of her local branch of the Relief Society, the women's organization of the Church of Jesus Christ of Latter-day Saints. In this capacity, according to her obituary, she "took special care of single mothers, widows and people of low income – no questions asked."

== Career ==
=== Involvement in activist organizations ===
According to The Park Record, Toomer started her activist career in 1976. She began by writing letters and delivering speeches. She played a major role in the formation of activist organizations, founding Advocates for Utah's Handicapped and co-founding the Utah Independent Living Center (ULIC) in 1981. She served as vice chairperson of the ULIC before becoming its chairperson in 1984. She fought for federal funding for the ULIC and hired people with disabilities to run the center. Toomer was also involved with ADAPT (American Disabled for Attendant Programs Today) from its inception. In 1991, she helped organize the Disabled Rights Action Committee and served as its treasurer and secretary. She also joined the Martin Luther King Jr. Human Rights Commission and the Professional Ethics Committee of the Utah State Bar.

=== Protests ===
Dissatisfied with the results of her previous, less direct efforts, Toomer joined protests in many states against a lack of accessibility on public transportation. One of her earliest protests, a "crawl-on" in Denver in 1983, involved chanting "We will ride!" and "rallying in the cold and blocking bus routes and buildings until the transit agency caved." These "crawl-ons" involved disabled people crawling into and out of public buses to protest the lack of wheelchair lifts. Toomer spearheaded "crawl-ons" against the Utah Transit Authority (UTA) in 1985, the demonstrations culminating in Toomer and others "chaining themselves to the buses." Toomer also spoke to a crowd of UTA executives at a conference, protesting the lack of accessibility on local buses. For eight years, the UTA had denied ADAPT's requests to install wheelchair lifts; but after Toomer and other ADAPT activists "went out into Main Street during rush hour and stopped all of the buses by placing themselves in traffic," the UTA agreed to a meeting.

Toomer then took part in the demonstrations in Washington D.C. to promote the passage of the Americans with Disabilities Act (ADA). She was "the only known Utahn to actively participate" in these protests. Then, in 1992, she participated in a protest against a telethon put on by the Jerry Lewis Muscular Dystrophy Association. The fundraiser, in Toomer's words, advertised disabled people as being "helpless, hopeless, non-functioning and non-contributing". After the ADA was passed in 1990, Toomer fought for businesses and organizations to adhere to it. She participated in protests against Greyhound Lines. While being honored with the Rosa Parks Award by the Salt Lake City Branch of the NAACP in 2017, Toomer said, "I've always felt that Miss Parks and I have the same goals. She wanted to get from the back of the bus. I wanted to get on the bus." Toomer was arrested at least 35 times for her activism.

=== Lawsuits and lobbying ===
In 1991, Toomer was denied access to flights to Boise, Idaho and Utah because she did not have "an attendant capable of rendering assistance during the flight." Toomer engaged in a lawsuit claiming that SkyWest Airlines had violated the Air Carrier Access Act and the Rehabilitation Act of 1973. As a result, the court ruled that airlines that maintain such requirements are not in violation of the law unless the airlines have received federal funding. In 2000, she lobbied for one in every four new apartments constructed in Utah to be accessible, upholding the Fair Housing Act. In 2006, Toomer and the Disabled Rights Action Committee sued the transportation company City Cab, claiming that their vans didn't comply with the ADA; however, the court ruled that the company was not violating the law.

Toomer reported vehicles occupying parking spots designated for people with disabilities without having proper tags. She worked to help get curb cuts in Utah for better wheelchair accessibility. Toomer was also a longtime delegate for the Democratic Party.

Throughout her life, one of Toomer's areas of focus in her activism was enabling people with disabilities to choose to live independently. Frustrated by the practice of people with disabilities being placed in nursing homes unnecessarily, Toomer pressed for the Olmstead decision to be upheld so that people with disabilities could remain in their homes and communities. She lobbied for federal aid, state aid, and affordable housing options for the elderly and persons with disabilities. In this effort, she "personally lobbied President Bill Clinton and Cabinet members of the George W. Bush administration". In 1997, Orrin Hatch mentioned Toomer in his speech at the dedication of the Military Service Memorial.

== Awards ==
Toomer received multiple awards for her advocacy. In 2000, she was awarded a Women of Courageous Action Award from the Utah National Organization for Women. In 2005, Toomer was given the Utah Issues' Joe Duke Rosati Hell Raiser Award. She was then recognized with a Martin Luther King Jr. Drum Major Award and the Community Justice Award in 2008, the AARP Outstanding Volunteer Award in 2014, the Crossroads Urban Center Lifetime Achievement Award in 2015, and the Rosa Parks Award from the Salt Lake Branch of the NAACP in 2017.

== Death and legacy ==
Toomer died of respiratory failure on April 24, 2018, at the age of 88. She had continued to work as an activist "well into her 80s". One of her last efforts had including lobbying for federal financial support for in-home caretakers for disabled persons. Her role as one of the "leading advocates for civil rights for people with disabilities and the poor in Utah" spanned four decades. In 2018, Toomer was posthumously honored with the Advocate of the Year Community Justice Award from the Disability Law Center for her advocacy for "equality, accessibility and civil rights for people with disabilities." The Disability Law Center also established the Barbara G. Toomer Disability Rights Fellowship in her honor. Additionally, ADAPT honored Toomer in their Fun Run fundraiser. After her death, one of Toomer's mentees recorded: "Her commitment to people with disabilities never wavered. ... She was an unstoppable force for the fair and equal treatment for all people."

Toomer and her husband Ross donated their bodies to the University of Utah. She was then buried in the Utah Veterans Cemetery in Bluffdale, Utah.
