= ADAPT =

U.S. disability rights group

ADAPT (formerly American Disabled for Attendant Programs Today) is a United States grassroots disability rights organization with chapters in 30 states and Washington, D.C.

== History ==
The Atlantis Community was started in Denver, Colorado, in 1975, when Reverend Wade Blank, a non-disabled former nursing home recreational director, assisted several severely disabled nursing home residents to move out and start their own community. In 1978 protests were held in Denver by members of the Atlantis Community, and Blank, against the wheelchair inaccessibility of public buses in that city. These protests included the nation's first demonstration for wheelchair-accessible public buses, which was on July 5 and 6. At that protest nineteen members of the Atlantis Community (called the Gang of Nineteen) chanted "We will ride" and blocked buses with their wheelchairs, staying in the streets throughout the night. In 1983, the Gang of Nineteen started ADAPT after several years of similar local bus protests. Originally, ADAPT's name was an acronym that stood for Americans Disabled for Accessible Public Transit, since the group's initial issue was to get wheelchair-accessible lifts on buses.

Throughout the 1980s, the campaign for bus lifts expanded out from Denver to cities nationwide. ADAPTers became well known for their tactic of immobilizing buses to draw attention to the need for lifts. Wheelchair users would stop a bus in front and back, and others would get out of their chairs and crawl up the steps of an inaccessible bus to dramatize the issue. Not only city buses but interstate bus services like Greyhound were targeted. By the end of the decade, after protests and lawsuits, ADAPT finally saw bus lifts required by law as part of the Americans with Disabilities Act (ADA) in 1990. At that time, the group began looking for the next logical step in disability rights advocacy, while ensuring follow-through of transportation provisions in the ADA. That year the group changed its name to Americans Disabled Attendant Programs Today.

In 1992, the protest on July 5 and 6, 1978, was commemorated with a plaque at the intersection of Colfax and Broadway (which is where the protest was held). This plaque was replaced in 2005 to commemorate the 15th anniversary of the ADA. The plaque states that the bus stop was dedicated by the Regional Transportation District (RTD) in memory of Reverend Wade Blank, to commemorate the 15th anniversary of the Americans with Disabilities Act.

In May 2017 ADAPT organized a protest in Washington, D.C., against changes to Medicaid as part of Representative Paul Ryan's budget proposal that would have cut Medicaid funding and given more control of the program to the states. Around 100 disability protesters were arrested in D.C., and similar protests were led by local ADAPT groups all around the country. Throughout these protests, ADAPT used their Twitter and Facebook feeds to share photos and links to the media to cover the event, which included images of protesters being arrested, to gain and mobilize support from the broader community.

== Internet presence ==
This US Disability Rights Flag has been used by ADAPT in their advocacy, and is sometimes known as the ADAPT Flag

ADAPT's website provides information on its issues and actions. The site also archives photos and reports from past national actions. Most of the pictures posted are by the photographer Tom Olin, who has taken ADAPT photos for over two decades. ADAPT's most well known visual logo, shown on their website, depicts the international wheelchair symbol, but with the person holding their arms aloft to break the chains that bind them.

ADAPT also has a YouTube account which features short videos directly posted by ADAPT activists, documenting their support of the organization. ADAPT has a social media presence in the form of a Twitter and Facebook feed, both with over 1600 followers. This helps them connect to their followers and other activists, and to increase their public visibility.

== See also ==
- Disability rights movement
- Capitol Crawl
- J. Quinn Brisben
- Barbara Toomer
