= Hipparchus (Martian crater) =

Crater on Mars

Hipparchus Crater
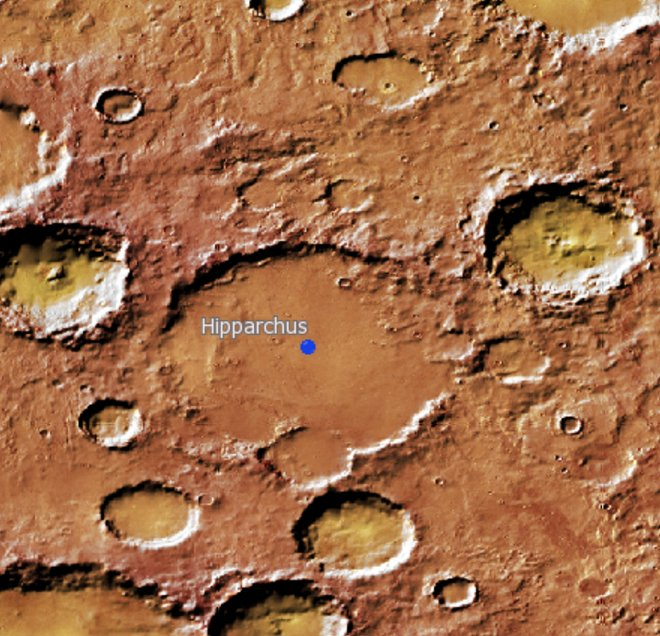
- Location of Hipparchus Crater
- Planet: Mars
- Region: Phaethontis quadrangle
- Coordinates: 44.8°S 151.4°W
- Quadrangle: Phaethontis
- Diameter: 93 km
- Eponym: Hipparchus

Hipparchus is an impact crater in the Phaethontis quadrangle of Mars, located at 44.8° S latitude and 151.4° W longitude. It is 93 kilometers (58 miles) in diameter. It was named after the ancient Greek astronomer Hipparchus in 1973.

== Channels ==
There is abundant evidence that water once flowed in river valleys on Mars. Images of curved channels have been seen in images from Mars spacecraft dating back to the early seventies with the Mariner 9 orbiter. Indeed, a study published in June 2017, calculated that the volume of water needed to carve all the channels on Mars was even larger than the proposed ocean that the planet may have had. Water was probably recycled many times from the ocean to rainfall around Mars. Some of the pictures on this page show channels in Hipparchus Crater.

== Gallery ==
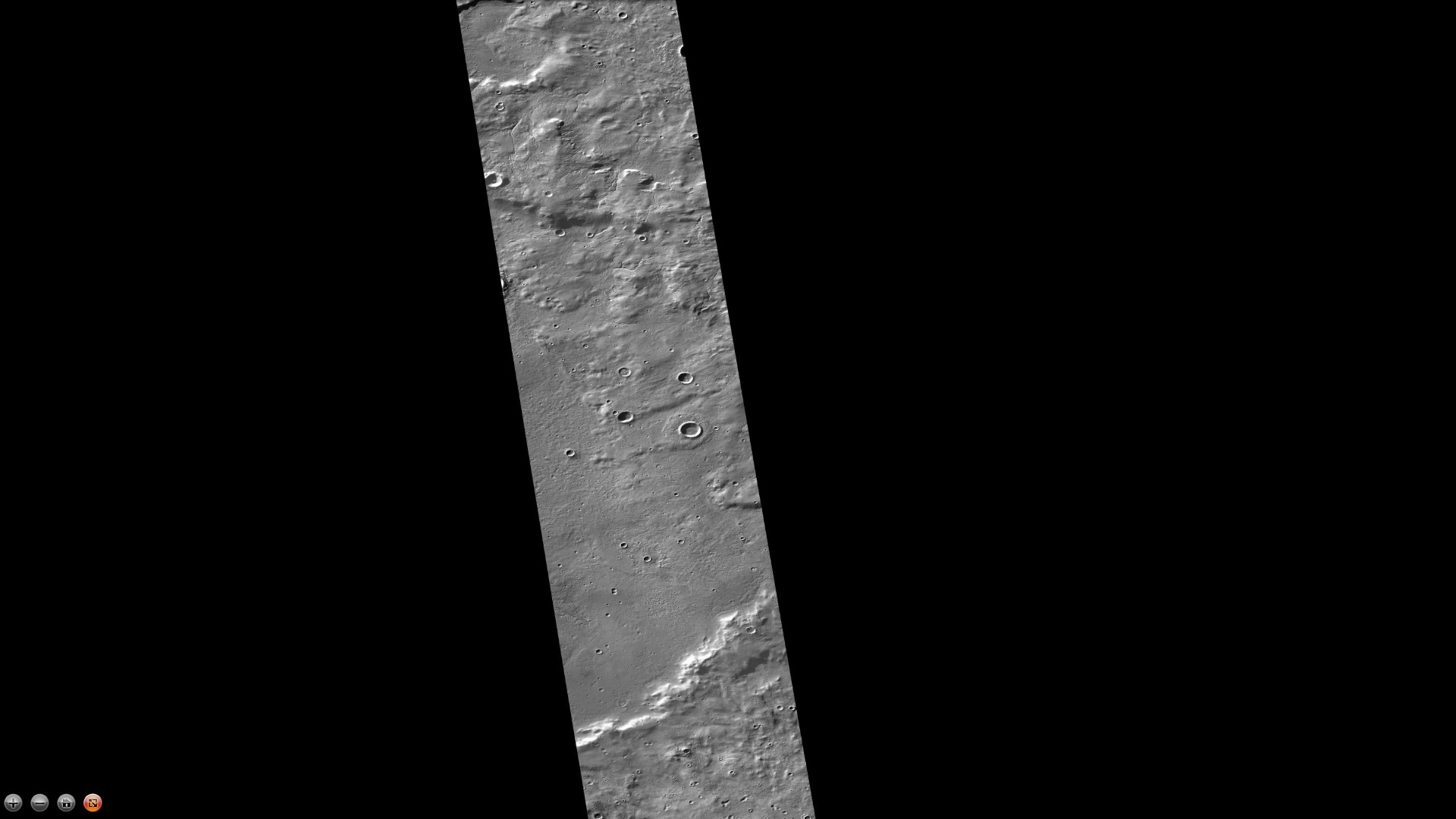
East side of Hipparchus, as seen by CTX camera (on Mars Reconnaissance Orbiter (MRO)

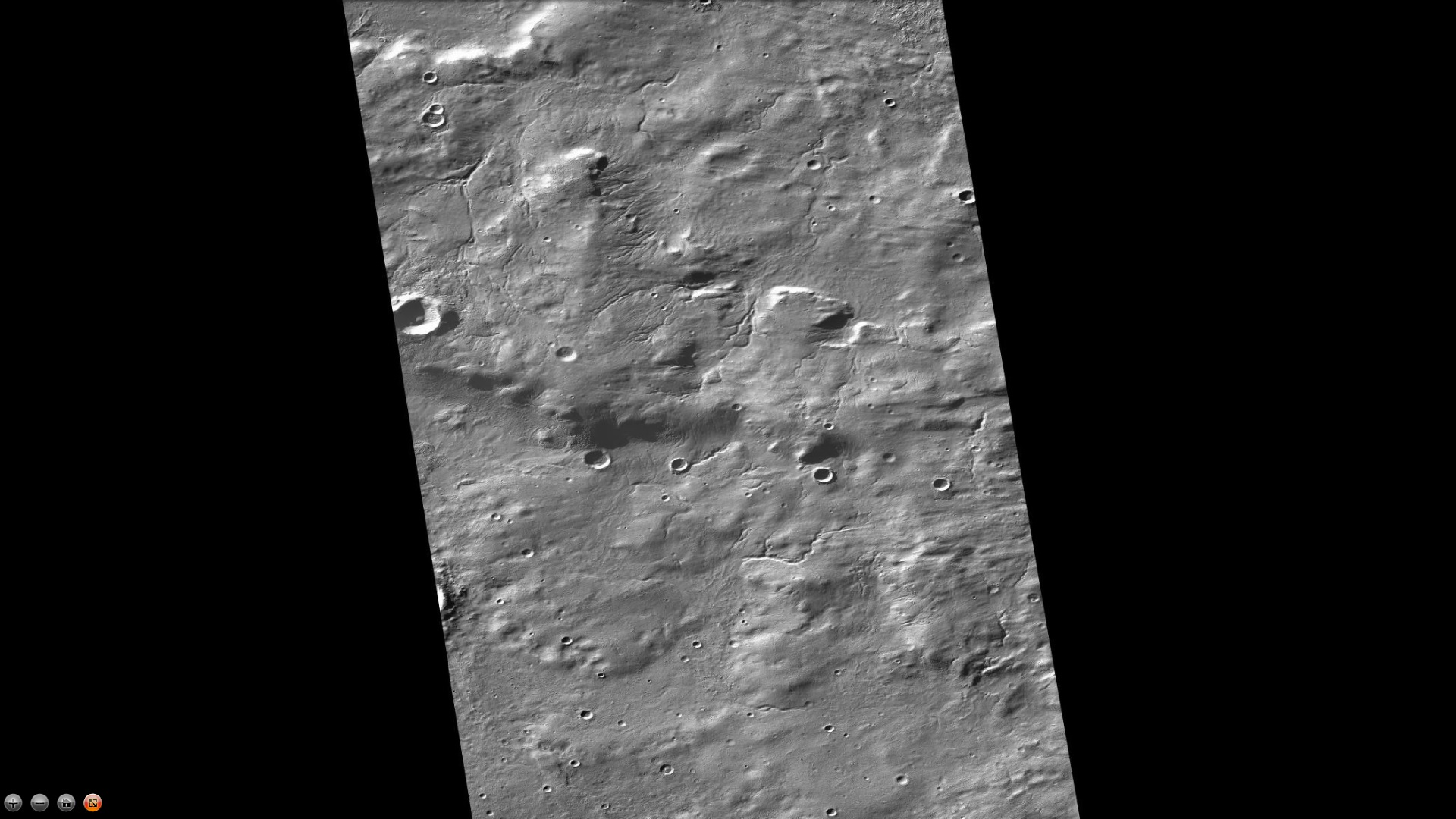
Small channels in Hipparchus, as seen by CTX camera on MRO (enlargement of the previous image)

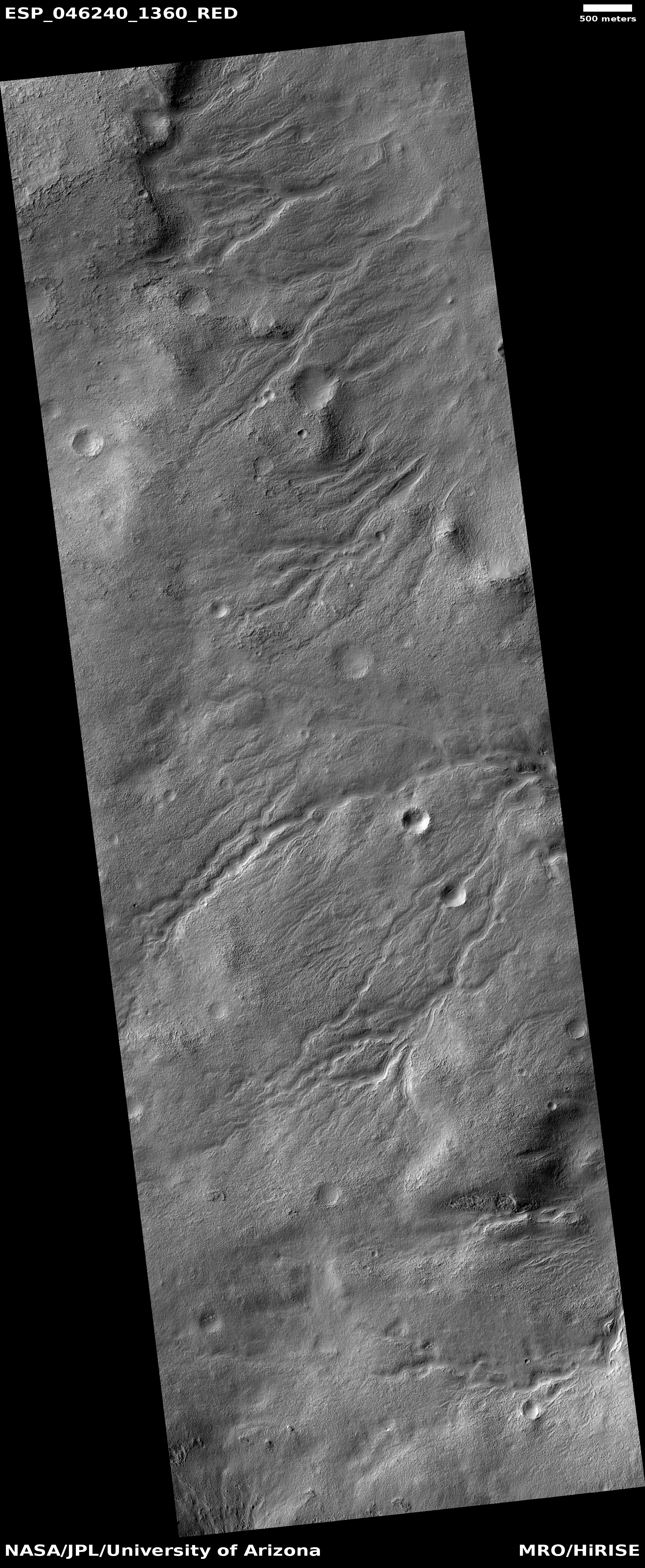
Wide view of channels on rim of Hipparchus, as seen by HiRISE under HiWish program

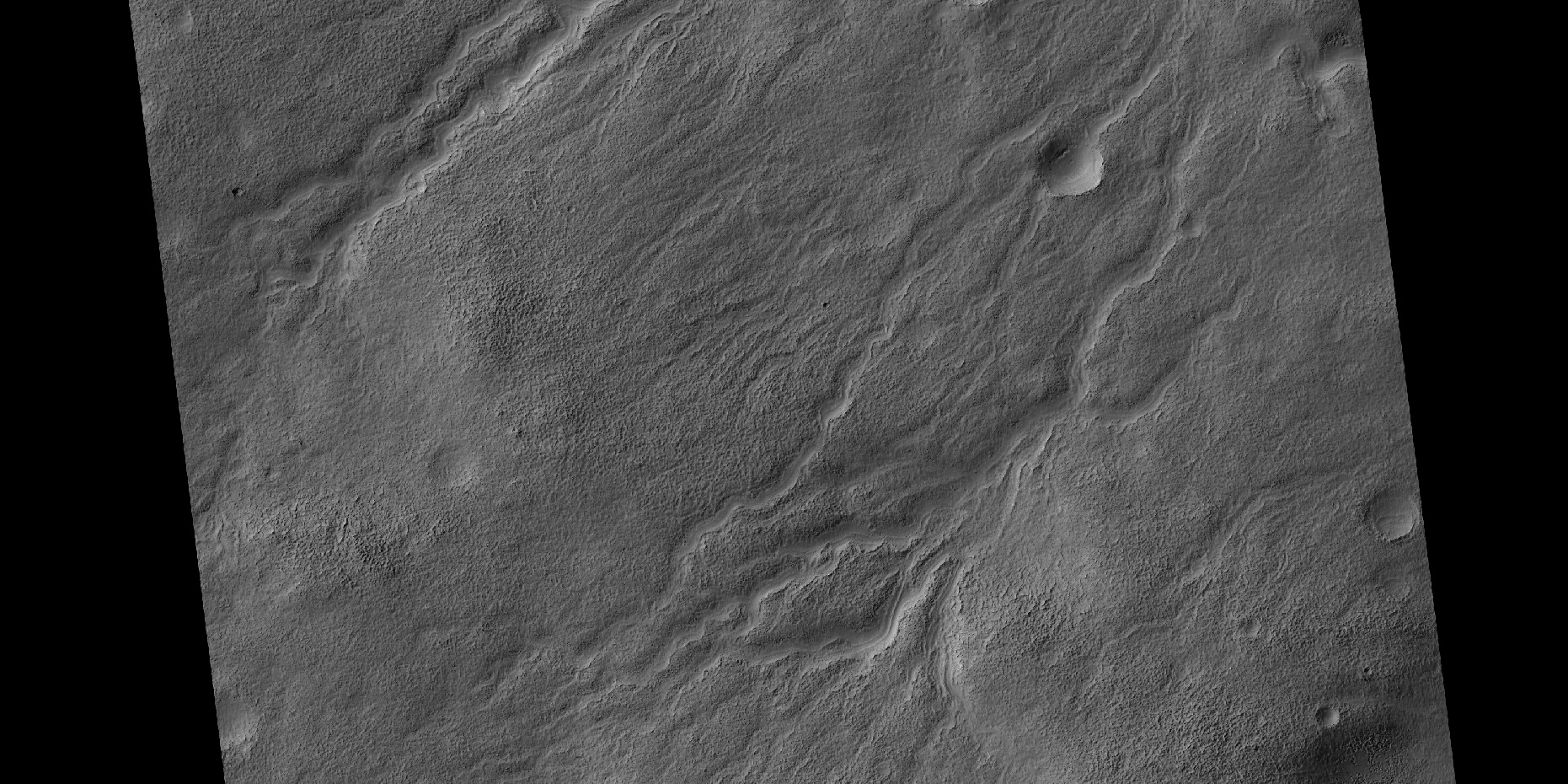
Close view of channels on rim of Hipparchus, as seen by HiRISE under HiWish program

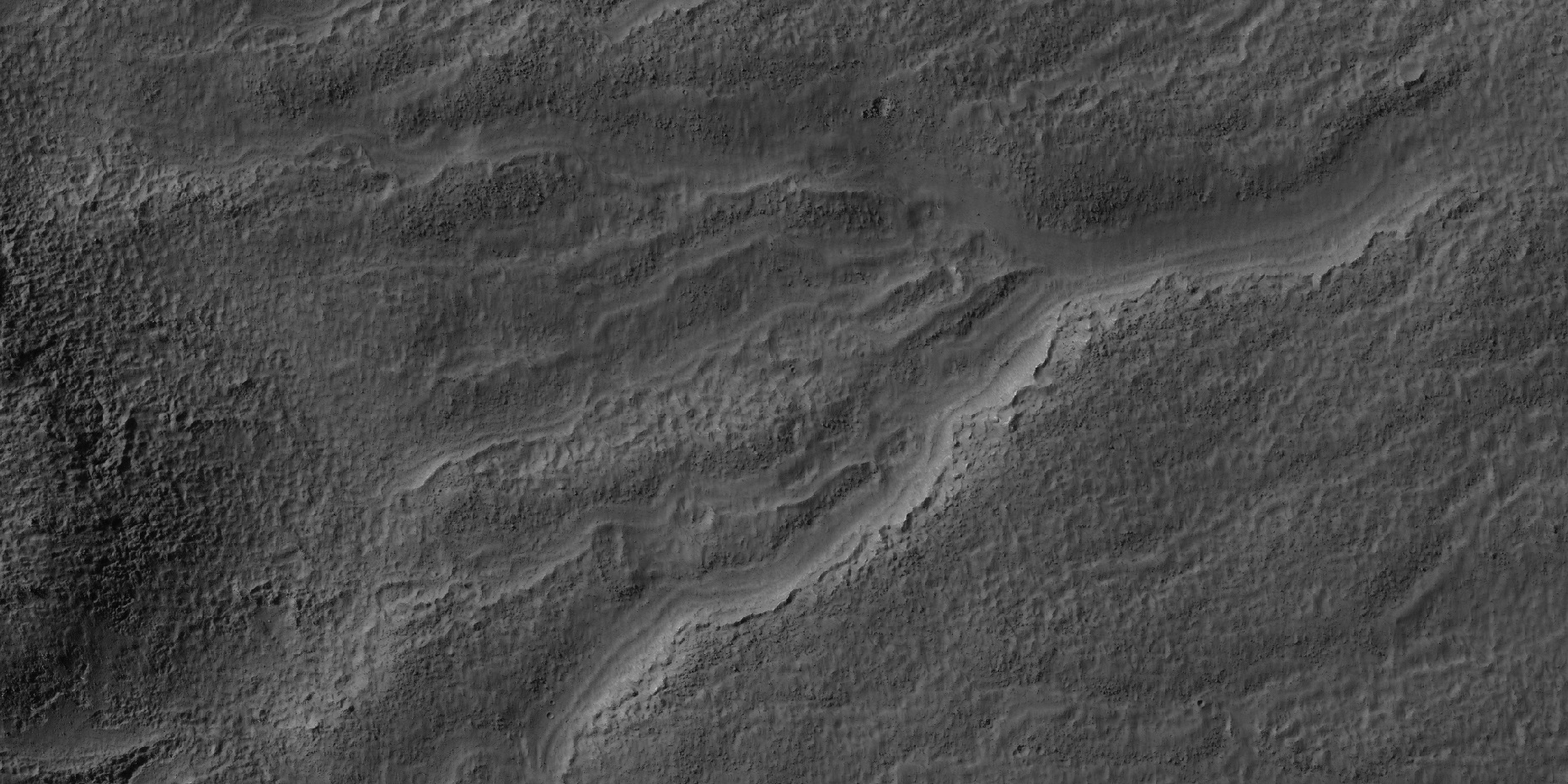
Close view of channels on rim of Hipparchus, as seen by HiRISE under HiWish program

== See also ==
- List of craters on Mars
