= Karl Manitius =

German historian (1899–1979)

Karl Manitius (23 July 1899 – 26 December 1979) was a German historian.

He was the son of the historian and Latinist Max Manitius (1858–1933), born in Dresden. Returning from World War I he studied Latin and German history in Leipzig. His publication of 1924 directed international attention to the Frankish chroniclers of the Carolingian epoch. From 1924 to 1945 he taught history in many Gymnasien and state high schools, in Leipzig, Waldenburg in Saxony and eventually in Dresden. Through collaboration with Fritz Rörig he joined the team producing the Monumenta Germaniae Historica, where he concentrated on Early Medieval literary texts. In 1958 appeared his editions of Gunzo's Epistola ad Augienses, and Anselm of Besate's, Rhetorimachia. In several articles and monographs he examined the history of medieval libraries. Following his move to Bavaria in 1969 there finally appeared in Weimar his editions of Sextus Amarcius's Sermones, over which he had been labouring since 1955. In 1973 appeared his edition of Eupolemius's Messiade.

He died in Bernried.
