= Mollweide =

Mollweide may refer to:

- Karl Mollweide, mathematician (1774–1825).

- Mollweide projection, a pseudocylindrical map projection.
- Mollweide Glacier, a glacier the Victoria region of Antarctica.
- Mollweide's formula, a mathematical equation.
