= Book of Curiosities =

Arabic book

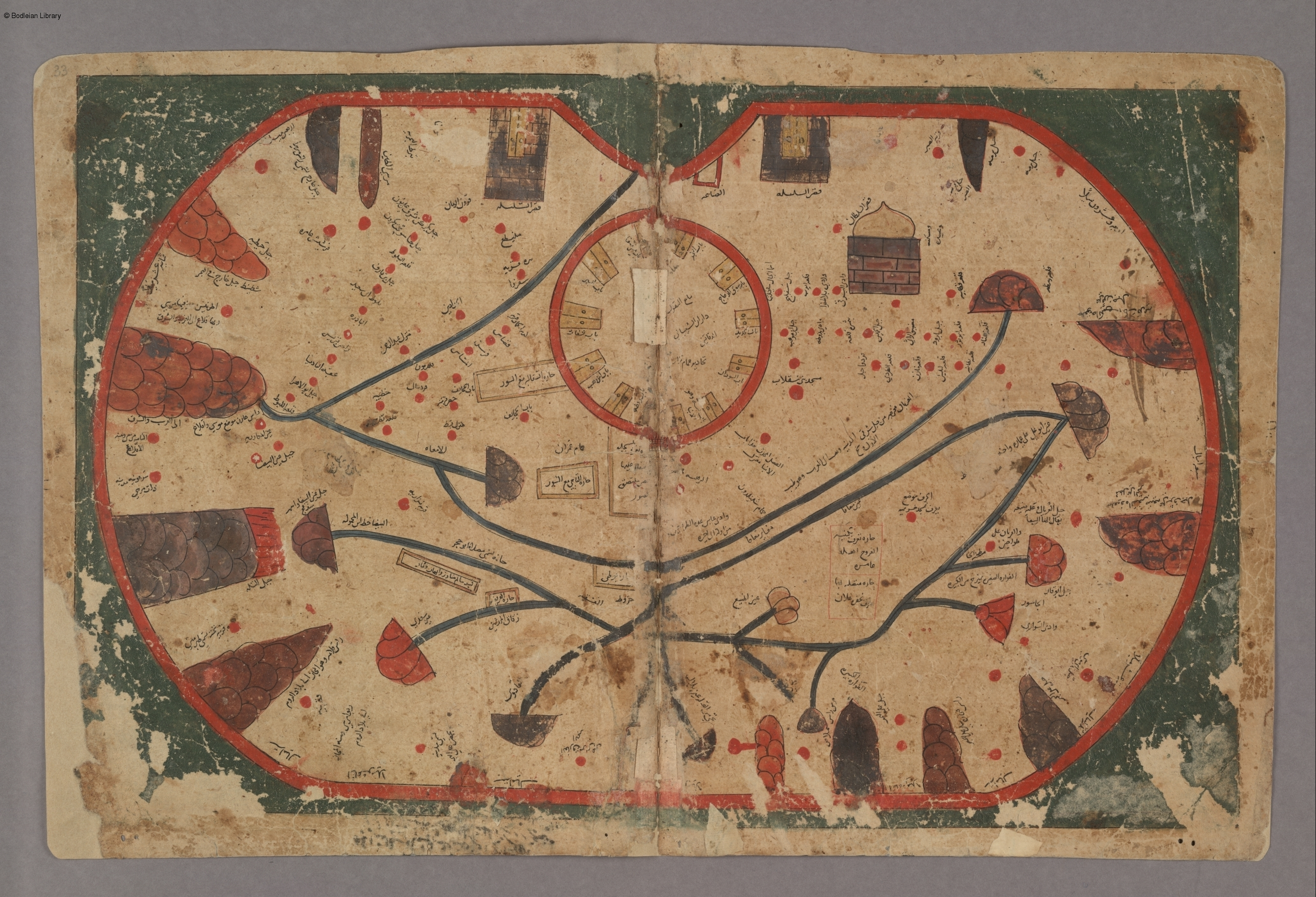
Map of Sicily from a 13th-century copy of the Fatimid cosmography, The Book of Curiosities, housed in the Bodleian Library at Oxford University

The Book of Curiosities (Arabic: Kitāb Gharā’ib al-funūn wa-mulaḥ al-ʿuyūn, literally translated as Book of Curiosities of the Sciences and Marvels for the Eyes) is an anonymous 11th-century Arabic cosmography from Fatimid Egypt containing a series of early illustrated maps of the world and celestial diagrams of the universe and sky. The Book of Curiosities contains 17 maps in total, 14 of which are extremely rare not only in Islamic cartography but also in greater medieval map history. The cosmography includes the earliest recorded map of Sicily as well as a rectangular world map, considered the earliest surviving map with a graphic scale. The autograph manuscript has not survived, but the Bodleian Library of Oxford University acquired one of the only known copies of the manuscript in 2002, making its contents widely accessible today due to its digitization. Based on the production processes and physical materials of the copy, such as paper and pigment, scholars date the production of this copy to the early 13th century.

== Historical Context and Authorship ==
The author of The Book of Curiosities does not provide his name, but over the course of the treatise reveals information about himself by referencing historical events that occurred during his time. Scholars have been able to authenticate these events during history and situate him and the manuscript's composition between 1020 and 1050 AD. Moreover, the author is believed to have lived in Egypt and composed the cosmography during the reign of the Fatimid Caliph-Imams, as he acknowledges the legitimacy of the Fatimid Imams in a passage at the beginning of the treatise, where he even provides a brief history of the dynasty. The manuscript is also dedicated to a patron, who is similarly unnamed.

Professor Emilie Savage-Smith of Oxford University emphasizes the importance of seeing the universe as both a macrocosm and a microcosm in order to understand the "structure and composition of The Book of Curiosities," as the treatise covers both terrestrial and celestial concepts. She defines the macrocosm as the "entire celestial universe," whereas the microcosm is "the earthly realm of humans regarded as a miniature reflection of the universe."

== Content and Composition ==
=== Content ===
The Book of Curiosities contains both historical and geographical writing and descriptions, as well as maps and illustrations. The chapters are methodical and almost academic in style, with the first chapters covering "basic principles" and the later chapters going deeper to discuss stars, comets, planets, winds, and earthquakes. The treatise is sectioned into two books, although there is some debate over whether the author intended to split the cosmography into five parts. Book I charts the heavens over 10 chapters, covering subjects such as astronomy, astrology, and "star lore." During this time, telescopes had not yet been invented so Book I depicts only the five planets that could be seen by the naked eye (Venus, Mercury, Mars, Jupiter, and Saturn). Egyptians at the time, however, knew that the earth was spherical, as the author gives an account of the circumference of the earth. Book II details the earth in 25 chapters. The author cites several external sources throughout the treatise, and has indicated that Book II draws from the Geography of Ptolemy. The author includes two world maps in the book, one circular and one rectangular. Book II also contains maps of the Indian Ocean, the Mediterranean, and the Caspian, as well as river-maps of the Tigris, the Euphrates, the Indus, the Oxus, and the Nile. The author does not limit his scope to just sky and sea, and spends the last five chapters of the book discussing "'curiosities' such as monstrous animals and wondrous plants."

Savage-Smith refers to the manuscript as "a reader’s digest guide to the universe" due to the deluge of information which the author presents in simple wording that lacks technical detail. The author's focus is more historical and geographical, rather than mathematical. The cosmography was thus not intended for practical use on a ship, but more-so for wealthy Fatimid patrons who were less versed in the technicalities of cartography and navigation.

=== Composition ===
The Book of Curiosities comprises 46 folios which equals 96 pages. Each page measures 324 x 245 mm. The paper used to compose the 13th century copy of the cosmography is "lightly glossed, biscuit-brown," and "sturdy," yet "soft and relatively opaque." No watermarks have been found on the paper. Specialists have been able to date the manuscript's composition using the production process of the paper, for it was most likely produced using a grass mould, a typical method used in Egypt and Syria in the 13th and 14th centuries. The pages of the manuscript are frayed at the edges but also show signs of frequent repairs over time. The copyist wrote the text in Naskh script using "dense black ink" while choosing to write the headings in red ink. The labelling on the maps is done in a similar script but is much smaller in size. A careful study of the maps in the manuscript has revealed that some illustrations, such as those of comets and small islands, have been dusted with gold or silver flakes, while other curved areas depicting water are tarnished silver. The author painted red-brown areas of land in an "oxidized lead red." Specialists have also found some regions of the maps that may have been "over-painted or coated in a shiny lacquer-like material that is now crackled and crazed."

== The Rectangular Map of the World ==
The Rectangular World Map from a 13th Century copy of The Book of Curiosities originally produced in 11th century Fatimid Egypt. Currently at the Bodleian Library of Oxford University.

The rectangular map of the world in The Book of Curiosities is considered the earliest surviving map with a graphic scale, not only in Islamic but also European cartographic history. The map is a bifolio and comprises the entirety of the second chapter of Book II, which describes the earth. The map's features are reminiscent of the cartographical systems of Antiquity as well as the works of Islamic astronomers such as Al-Khwarazmi. The author intended to depict the inhabited world, so the continent of Africa is left out of the map because it was thought to be uninhabited at the time.

This map is different from others in The Book of Curiosities because it is a stand-alone map. Not only does it take up all of the second chapter, but it conveys information independent of a complementary text, which almost always accompanies other maps in the book. It is also unique due to its rectangular shape, which differs from previous medieval world maps which were circular.

Because it incorporates both Greek and Arabic cartographical techniques, the rectangular world map is evidence of the flow of geographical knowledge and ideas from "the pre-Islamic Greek and Syriac-speaking Middle East to the Arabic scientific culture of early Islam." This map is the earliest known map with a scale bar, or graticule, prior to the European Renaissance and suggests that the author's framework of mathematical geography comes from his exposure to the cartographic systems of Antiquity. The scale bar at the top of the map is not mathematically correct, but it indicates that the author was familiar with the cartographical concepts of Ptolemy. At the same time, the author incorporated traditional Arabic mapping practices by flipping the orientation to have the south at the top of the map, rather than the north. He also added 395 city names to the map, a choice that differs from most medieval world maps which depict only regional names. The red dots that fill the map represent particular cities and trade routes and are pulled from the maps of Ibn Ḥawqal, a 10th-century Muslim geographer. The author of The Book of Curiosities used a wide variety of scholarly thought, incorporating many different ideas and techniques (citing over 20 written sources) to create not only this map, but a truly curious and marvelous book that scholars continue to learn new things from today.
