= Abu Ja'far ibn Habash =

Abu Ja'far ibn Habash was a Persian astronomer. He was most likely a son of Habash al-Hasib. Since his father died after 864 AD at the age of 100, it can be concluded that he was active in 3rd century AH (9th century AD). According to Ibn Nadim and Qifti, he wrote a book on astrolabe, named al-ostorlab al-mosatah.
