= Geography and cartography in the medieval Islamic world =

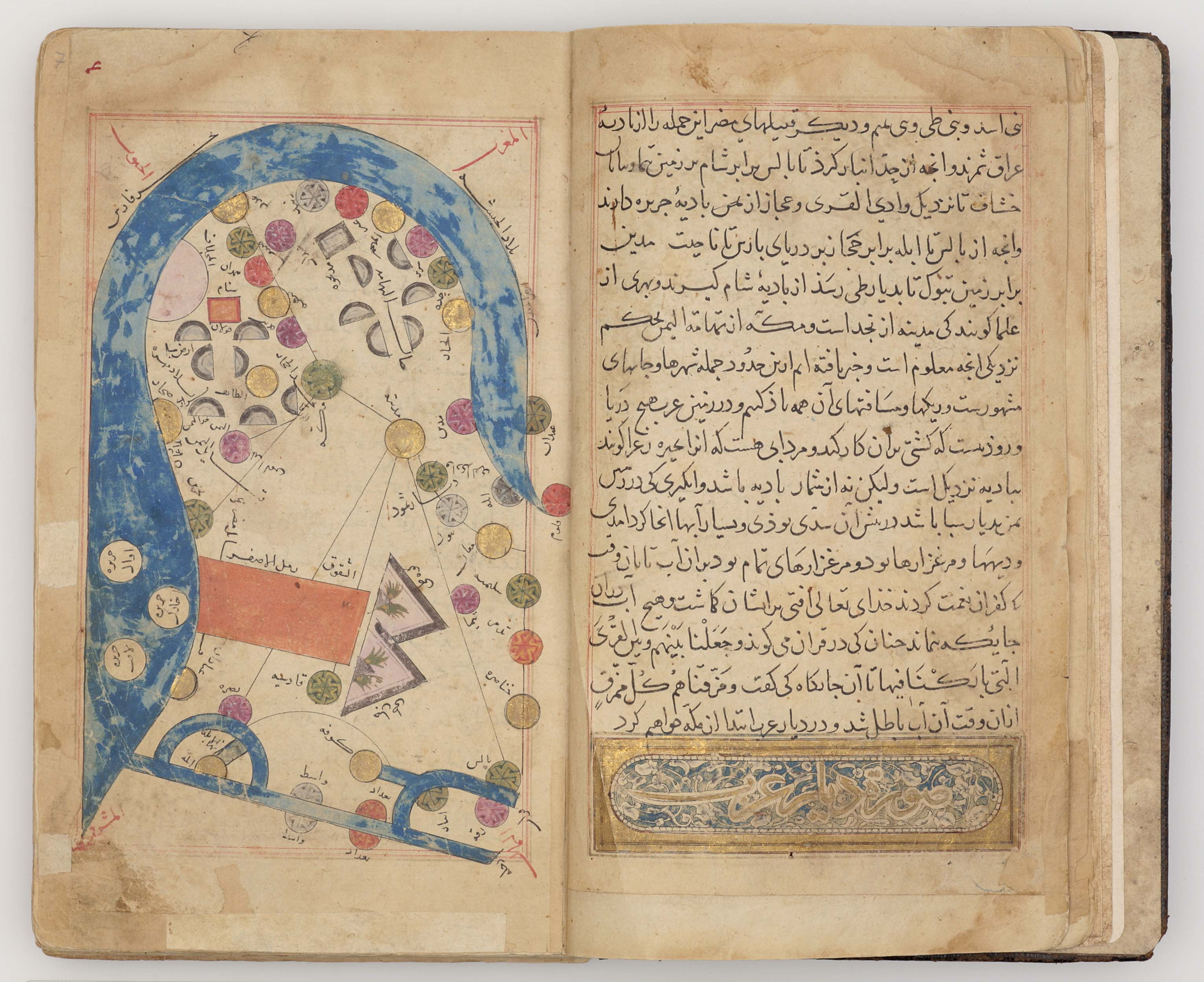
Map of Fars from the Kitab al-Masalik wa'l-Mamalik (Book of postal routes and kingdoms) of al-Istakhri

Medieval Islamic geography and cartography were the studies of geography and cartography in the Muslim world during the Islamic Golden Age (variously dated between the 8th century and 16th century). Muslim scholars made advances to the map-making traditions of earlier cultures, explorers and merchants learned in their travels across the Old World (Afro-Eurasia). Islamic geography had three major fields: exploration and navigation, physical geography, and cartography and mathematical geography. Islamic geography reached its apex with Muhammad al-Idrisi in the 12th century.

== History ==
=== 8th and 9th century ===
Islamic geography began in the 8th century, influenced by Hellenistic geography, combined with what explorers and merchants learned in their travels across the Old World (Afro-Eurasia). Muslim scholars engaged in extensive exploration and navigation during the 9th-12th centuries, including journeys across the Muslim world, in addition to regions such as China, Southeast Asia and Southern Africa. Various Islamic scholars contributed to the development of geography and cartography, with the most notable including Al-Khwārizmī, Abū Zayd al-Balkhī (founder of the "Balkhi school"), Al-Masudi, Abu Rayhan Biruni and Muhammad al-Idrisi.

Islamic geography was patronized by the Abbasid caliphs of Baghdad. An important influence in the development of cartography was the patronage of the Abbasid caliph al-Ma'mun, who reigned from 813 to 833. He commissioned several geographers to perform an arc measurement, determining the distance on Earth that corresponds to one degree of latitude along a meridian (al-Ma'mun's arc measurement). Thus his patronage resulted in the refinement of the definition of the Arabic mile (mīl in Arabic) in comparison to the stadion used in the Hellenistic world. These efforts also enabled Muslims to calculate the circumference of the Earth. Al-Mamun also commanded the production of a large map of the world, which has not survived, though it is known that its map projection type was based on Marinus of Tyre rather than Ptolemy.

Islamic cartographers inherited Ptolemy's Almagest and Geography in the 9th century. These works stimulated an interest in geography (particularly gazetteers) but were not slavishly followed. Instead, Arabian and Persian cartography followed Al-Khwārizmī in adopting a rectangular projection, shifting Ptolemy's Prime Meridian several degrees eastward, and modifying many of Ptolemy's geographical coordinates.

Having received Greek writings directly and without Latin intermediation, Arabian and Persian geographers made no use of T-O maps.

In the 9th century, the Persian mathematician and geographer, Habash al-Hasib al-Marwazi, employed spherical trigonometry and map projection methods in order to convert polar coordinates to a different coordinate system centred on a specific point on the sphere, in this the Qibla, the direction to Mecca. Abū Rayhān Bīrūnī (973–1048) later developed ideas which are seen as an anticipation of the polar coordinate system. Around 1025, he describes a polar equi-azimuthal equidistant projection of the celestial sphere. However, this type of projection had been used in ancient Egyptian star-maps and was not to be fully developed until the 15 and 16th centuries.

=== Khordadbeh–Jayhani tradition ===
The works of Ibn Khordadbeh (c. 870) and Jayhani (c. 910s) were at the basis of a new Perso-Arab tradition in Persia and Central Asia. The exact relationship between the books of Khordadbeh and Jayhani is unknown, because the two books had the same title, have often been mixed up, and Jayhani's book has been lost, so that it can only be approximately reconstructed from the works of other authors (mostly from the eastern parts of the Islamic world) who seem to have reused some of its contents. According to Vasily Bartold, Jayhani based his book primarily on the data he had collected himself, but also reused Khordadbeh's work to a considerable extent. Unlike the Balkhi school, geographers of the Khordadbeh–Jayhani tradition sought to describe the whole world as they knew it, including the lands, societies and cultures of non-Muslims. As vizier of the Samanid Empire, Jayhani's diplomatic correspondence allowed him to collect much valuable information from people in faraway lands. Nevertheless, Al-Masudi criticised Jayhani for overemphasising geological features of landscapes, stars and geometry, taxation systems, trade roads and stations allegedly few people used, while ignoring major population centres, provinces and military roads and forces.

=== Balkhi school ===
The Balkhī school of terrestrial mapping, originated by Abu Zayd al-Balkhi (from Balkh) in early 10th century Baghdad, and significantly developed by Istakhri, had a conservative and religious character: it was only interested in describing mamlakat al-Islām ("Islamic lands"), which the school divided into 20 or more iqlīms ("climes" or provinces). Balkhi and his followers reoriented geographic knowledge in order to bring it in line with certain concepts found in the Quran, emphasised the central importance of Mecca and Arabia, and ignored the non-Islamic world. This distinguished them from earlier geographers such as Ibn Khordadbeh and Al-Masudi, who described the whole world as they knew it. The geographers of this school, such as Istakhri, al-Muqaddasi and Ibn Hawqal, wrote extensively of the peoples, products, and customs of areas in the Muslim world, with little interest in the non-Muslim realms, and produced world atlases, each one featuring a world map and twenty regional maps.

=== Regional cartography ===
Islamic regional cartography is usually categorized into three groups: that produced by the "Balkhī school", the type devised by Muhammad al-Idrisi, and the type that are uniquely found in the Book of curiosities.

The maps by the Balkhī schools were defined by political, not longitudinal boundaries and covered only the Muslim world. In these maps the distances between various "stops" (cities or rivers) were equalized. The only shapes used in designs were verticals, horizontals, 90-degree angles, and arcs of circles; unnecessary geographical details were eliminated. This approach is similar to that used in subway maps, most notable used in the "London Underground Tube Map" in 1931 by Harry Beck.

Al-Idrīsī defined his maps differently. He considered the extent of the known world to be 160° and had to symbolize 50 dogs in longitude and divided the region into ten parts, each 16° wide. In terms of latitude, he portioned the known world into seven 'climes', determined by the length of the longest day. In his maps, many dominant geographical features can be found.

=== Book on the appearance of the Earth ===
Muhammad ibn Mūsā al-Khwārizmī's Kitāb ṣūrat al-Arḍ ("Book on the appearance of the Earth") was completed in 833. It is a revised and completed version of Ptolemy's Geography, consisting of a list of 2402 coordinates of cities and other geographical features following a general introduction.

Al-Khwārizmī, Al-Ma'mun's most famous geographer, corrected Ptolemy's gross overestimate for the length of the Mediterranean Sea (from the Canary Islands to the eastern shores of the Mediterranean); Ptolemy overestimated it at 63 degrees of longitude, while al-Khwarizmi almost correctly estimated it at nearly 50 degrees of longitude. Al-Ma'mun's geographers "also depicted the Atlantic and Indian Oceans as open bodies of water, not land-locked seas as Ptolemy had done. " Al-Khwarizmi thus set the Prime Meridian of the Old World at the eastern shore of the Mediterranean, 10–13 degrees to the east of Alexandria (the prime meridian previously set by Ptolemy) and 70 degrees to the west of Baghdad. Most medieval Muslim geographers continued to use al-Khwarizmi's prime meridian. Other prime meridians used were set by Abū Muhammad al-Hasan al-Hamdānī and Habash al-Hasib al-Marwazi at Ujjain, a centre of Indian astronomy, and by another anonymous writer at Basra.

=== Al-Biruni ===
Diagram illustrating a method proposed and used by Al-Biruni to estimate the radius and circumference of the Earth in the 11th century.

Abu Rayhan al-Biruni (973–1048) devised a novel method of determining the Earth's radius by means of the observation of the height of a mountain. He carried it out at Nandana in Pind Dadan Khan (present-day Pakistan). He used trigonometry to calculate the radius of the Earth using measurements of the height of a hill and measurement of the dip in the horizon from the top of that hill. His calculated radius for the Earth of 3928.77 miles was 2% higher than the actual mean radius of 3847.80 miles. His estimate was given as 12,803,337 cubits, so the accuracy of his estimate compared to the modern value depends on what conversion is used for cubits. The exact length of a cubit is not clear; with an 18-inch cubit his estimate would be 3,600 miles, whereas with a 22-inch cubit his estimate would be 4,200 miles. One significant problem with this approach is that Al-Biruni was not aware of atmospheric refraction and made no allowance for it. He used a dip angle of 34 arc minutes in his calculations, but refraction can typically alter the measured dip angle by about 1/6, making his calculation only accurate to within about 20% of the true value.

In his Codex Masudicus (1037), Al-Biruni theorized the existence of a landmass along the vast ocean between Asia and Europe, or what is today known as the Americas. He argued for its existence on the basis of his accurate estimations of the Earth's circumference and Afro-Eurasia's size, which he found spanned only two-fifths of the Earth's circumference, reasoning that the geological processes that gave rise to Eurasia must surely have given rise to lands in the vast ocean between Asia and Europe. He also theorized that at least some of the unknown landmass would lie within the known latitudes which humans could inhabit, and therefore would be inhabited.

=== Tabula Rogeriana ===
The Arab geographer Muhammad al-Idrisi produced his medieval atlas, Tabula Rogeriana or The Recreation for Him Who Wishes to Travel Through the Countries, in 1154. He incorporated the knowledge of Africa, the Indian Ocean and the Far East gathered by Arab merchants and explorers with the information inherited from the classical geographers to create the most accurate map of the world in pre-modern times. With funding from Roger II of Sicily (1097–1154), al-Idrisi drew on the knowledge collected at the University of Córdoba and paid draftsmen to make journeys and map their routes. The book describes the Earth as a sphere with a circumference of 22,900 miles (36,900 km) but maps it in 70 rectangular sections. Notable features include the correct dual sources of the Nile, the coast of Ghana and mentions of Norway. Climate zones were a chief organizational principle. A second and shortened copy from 1192 called Garden of Joys is known by scholars as the Little Idrisi.

On the work of al-Idrisi, S. P. Scott commented:

The compilation of Edrisi marks an era in the history of science. Not only is its historical information most interesting and valuable, but its descriptions of many parts of the earth are still authoritative. For three centuries geographers copied his maps without alteration. The relative position of the lakes which form the Nile, as delineated in his work, does not differ greatly from that established by Baker and Stanley more than seven hundred years afterwards, and their number is the same. The mechanical genius of the author was not inferior to his erudition. The celestial and terrestrial planisphere of silver which he constructed for his royal patron was nearly six feet in diameter, and weighed four hundred and fifty pounds; upon the one side the zodiac and the constellations, upon the other—divided for convenience into segments—the bodies of land and water, with the respective situations of the various countries, were engraved.

— S. P. Scott, History of the Moorish Empire in Europe

Al-Idrisi's atlas, originally called the Nuzhat in Arabic, served as a major tool for Italian, Dutch and French mapmakers from the 16th century to the 18th century.

=== Piri Reis map ===
The Piri Reis map is a world map compiled in 1513 by the Ottoman admiral and cartographer Piri Reis. Approximately one third of the map survives; it shows the western coasts of Europe and North Africa and the coast of Brazil with reasonable accuracy. Various Atlantic islands, including the Azores and Canary Islands, are depicted, as is the mythical island of Antillia and possibly Japan.

=== Others ===
Suhrāb, a late 10th-century Muslim geographer, accompanied a book of geographical coordinates with instructions for making a rectangular world map, with equirectangular projection or cylindrical equidistant projection. The earliest surviving rectangular coordinate map is dated to the 13th century and is attributed to Hamdallah al-Mustaqfi al-Qazwini, who based it on the work of Suhrāb. The orthogonal parallel lines were separated by one degree intervals, and the map was limited to Southwest Asia and Central Asia. The earliest surviving world maps based on a rectangular coordinate grid are attributed to al-Mustawfi in the 14th or 15th century (who used invervals of ten degrees for the lines), and to Hafiz-i Abru (died 1430).

In the 11th century, the Karakhanid Turkic scholar Mahmud al-Kashgari was the first to draw a unique Islamic world map, where he illuminated the cities and places of the Turkic peoples of Central and Inner Asia. He showed the lake Issyk-Kul (in nowadays Kyrgyzstan) as the centre of the world.

Ibn Battuta (1304–1368?) wrote "Rihlah" (Travels) based on three decades of journeys, covering more than 120,000 km through northern Africa, southern Europe, and much of Asia.

Muslim astronomers and geographers were aware of magnetic declination by the 15th century, when the Egyptian astronomer 'Abd al-'Aziz al-Wafa'i (d. 1469/1471) measured it as 7 degrees from Cairo.

== Instruments ==
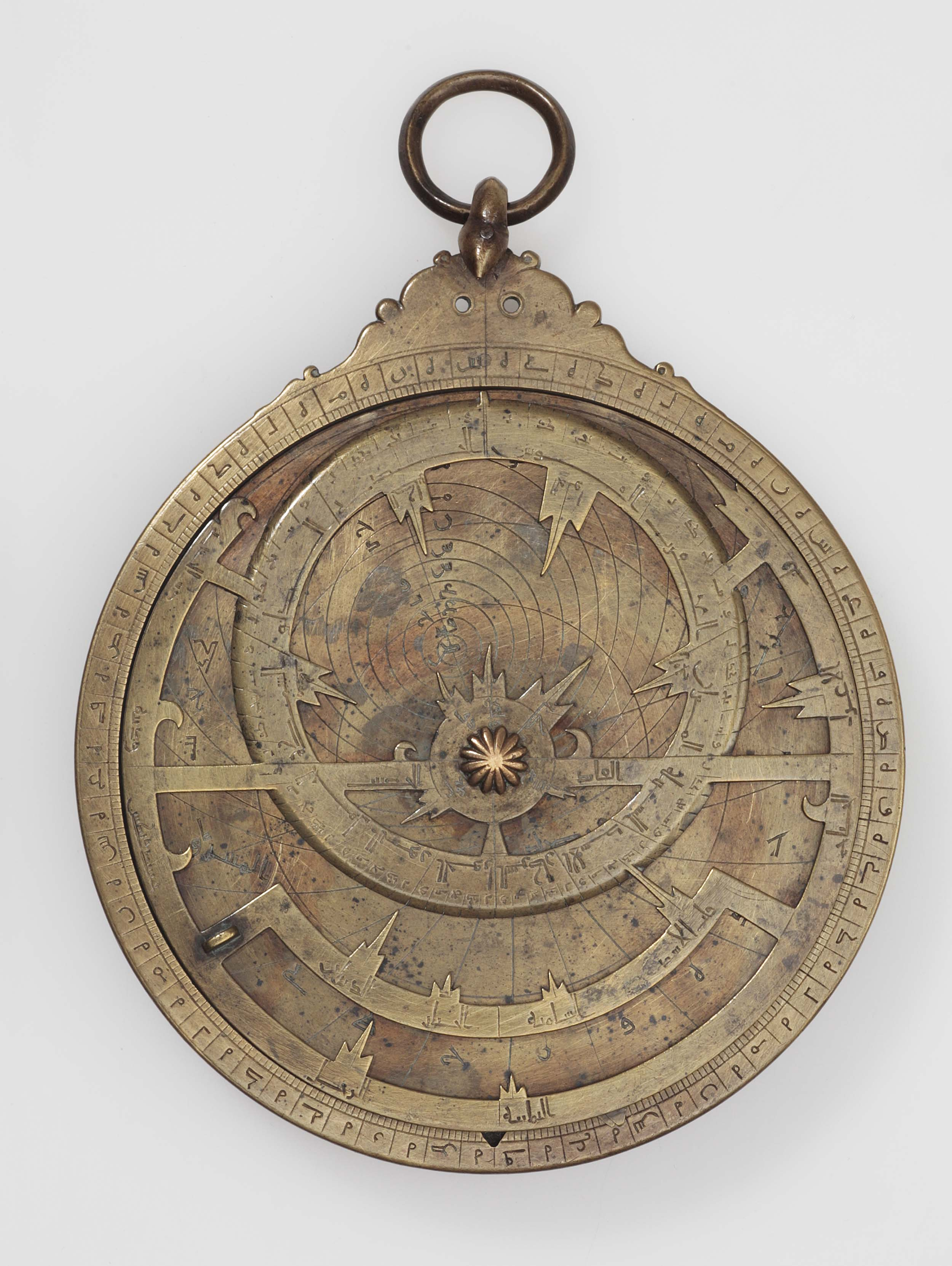
Astrolabe from 9th century North Africa

Muslim scholars invented and refined a number of scientific instruments in mathematical geography and cartography. These included the astrolabe, quadrant, gnomon, celestial sphere, sundial, and compass.

=== Astrolabe ===
Astrolabes were adopted and further developed in the medieval Islamic world, where Muslim astronomers introduced angular scales to the design, adding circles indicating azimuths on the horizon. It was widely used throughout the Muslim world, chiefly as an aid to navigation and as a way of finding the Qibla, the direction of Mecca. Eighth-century mathematician Muhammad al-Fazari is the first person credited with building the astrolabe in the Islamic world.

The mathematical background was established by Muslim astronomer Albatenius in his treatise Kitab az-Zij (c. 920 AD), which was translated into Latin by Plato Tiburtinus (De Motu Stellarum). The earliest surviving astrolabe is dated AH 315 (927–28 AD). In the Islamic world, astrolabes were used to find the times of sunrise and the rising of fixed stars, to help schedule morning prayers (salat). In the 10th century, al-Sufi first described over 1,000 different uses of an astrolabe, in areas as diverse as astronomy, astrology, navigation, surveying, timekeeping, prayer, Salat, Qibla, etc.

=== Compass ===
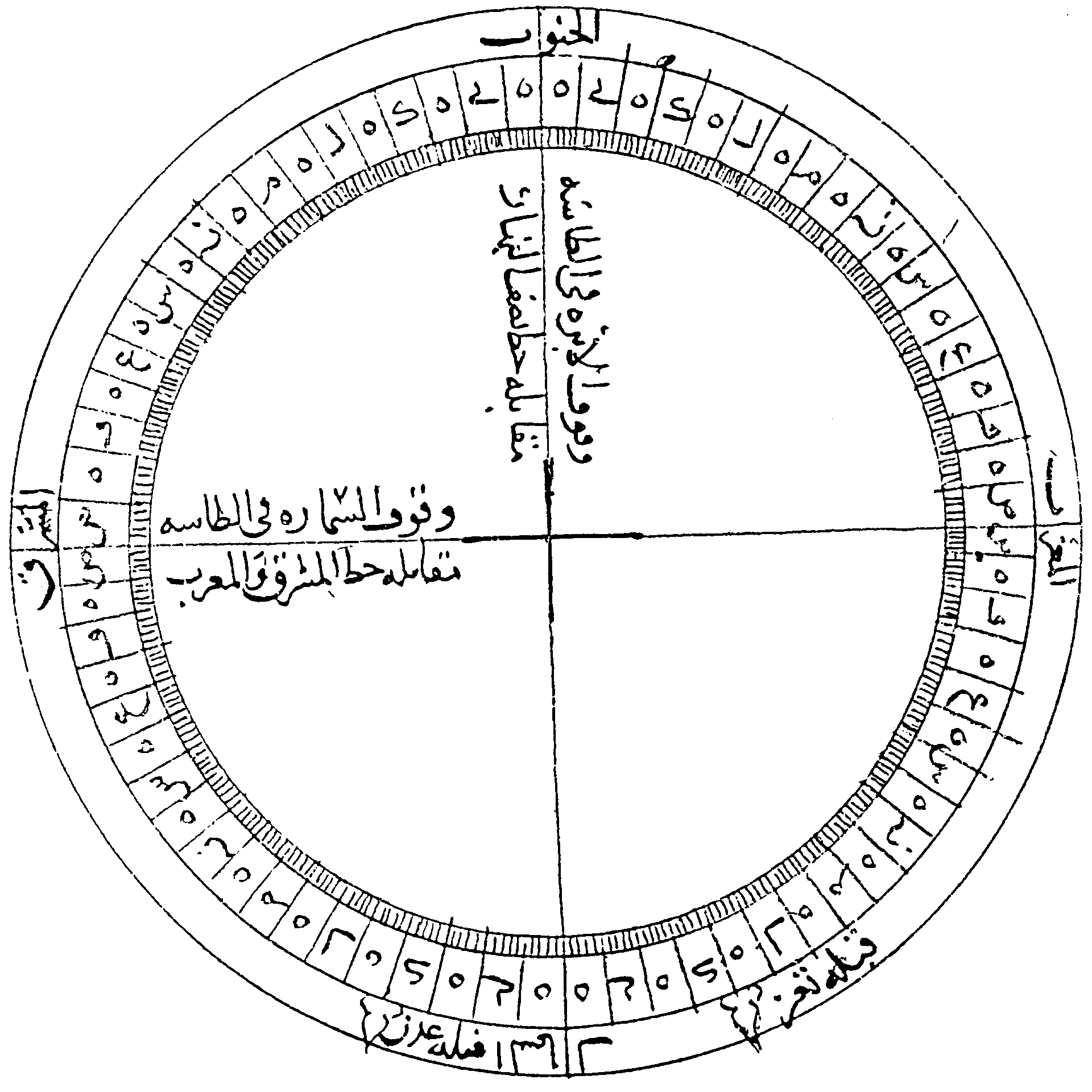
Al-Ashraf's diagram of the compass and Qibla. From MS Cairo TR 105, copied in Yemen, 1293.

The earliest reference to a compass in the Muslim world occurs in a Persian talebook from 1232, where a compass is used for navigation during a trip in the Red Sea or the Persian Gulf. The fish-shaped iron leaf described indicates that this early Chinese design has spread outside of China. The earliest Arabic reference to a compass, in the form of magnetic needle in a bowl of water, comes from a work by Baylak al-Qibjāqī, written in 1282 while in Cairo. Al-Qibjāqī described a needle-and-bowl compass used for navigation on a voyage he took from Syria to Alexandria in 1242. Since the author describes having witnessed the use of a compass on a ship trip some forty years earlier, some scholars are inclined to antedate its first appearance in the Arab world accordingly. Al-Qibjāqī also reports that sailors in the Indian Ocean used iron fish instead of needles.

Late in the 13th century, the Yemeni Sultan and astronomer al-Malik al-Ashraf described the use of the compass as a "Qibla indicator" to find the direction to Mecca. In a treatise about astrolabes and sundials, al-Ashraf includes several paragraphs on the construction of a compass bowl (ṭāsa). He then uses the compass to determine the north point, the meridian (khaṭṭ niṣf al-nahār), and the Qibla. This is the first mention of a compass in a medieval Islamic scientific text and its earliest known use as a Qibla indicator, although al-Ashraf did not claim to be the first to use it for this purpose.

In 1300, an Arabic treatise written by the Egyptian astronomer and muezzin Ibn Simʿūn describes a dry compass used for determining qibla. Like Peregrinus' compass, however, Ibn Simʿūn's compass did not feature a compass card. In the 14th century, the Syrian astronomer and timekeeper Ibn al-Shatir (1304–1375) invented a timekeeping device incorporating both a universal sundial and a magnetic compass. He invented it for the purpose of finding the times of prayers. Arab navigators also introduced the 32-point compass rose during this time. In 1399, an Egyptian reports two different kinds of magnetic compass. One instrument is a "fish" made of willow wood or pumpkin, into which a magnetic needle is inserted and sealed with tar or wax to prevent the penetration of water. The other instrument is a dry compass.

In the 15th century, the description given by Ibn Majid while aligning the compass with the pole star indicates that he was aware of magnetic declination. An explicit value for the declination is given by ʿIzz al-Dīn al-Wafāʾī (fl. 1450s in Cairo).

Premodern Arabic sources refer to the compass using the term ṭāsa (lit. "bowl") for the floating compass, or ālat al-qiblah ("qibla instrument") for a device used for orienting towards Mecca.

Friedrich Hirth suggested that Arab and Persian traders, who learned about the polarity of the magnetic needle from the Chinese, applied the compass for navigation before the Chinese did. However, Needham described this theory as "erroneous" and "it originates because of a mistranslation" of the term chia-ling found in Zhu Yu's book Pingchow Table Talks.

== Notable geographers ==
=== Khordadbeh–Jayhani tradition geographers ===
- Ibn Khordadbeh (820–912): Kitāb al-Masālik wa-l-Mamālik ("Book of Roads and Kingdoms")
- Abu Abdallah Muhammad ibn Ahmad al-Jayhani (died 925): Kitāb al-Masālik wal-Mamālik ("Book of Roads and Kingdoms", lost)
  - Ahmad ibn Rustah (10th century)
  - Al-Masudi (896–956): The Meadows of Gold
  - Al-Bakri (c. 1040–1094)
  - Gardizi (died 1061)
  - Muhammad Aufi

=== Balkhi school geographers ===
- Abu Zayd al-Balkhi (850–934): Suwar al-aqālīm ("Images of the Climes") or al-Amthila wa-suwar al-ard ("Similitudes and Images of the Earth"), written in 920 or after
  - Istakhri (died mid-10th century): al-Masālik wal-Mamālik ("Roads and Kingdoms").
    - Ibn Hawqal (died after 978): Kitāb Sūrat al-ard ("Book of the Face of the Earth")
    - Al-Maqdisi (c. 945/946–991): Aḥsan al-taqāsīm fi maʾarfat al-aqalīm ("The Finest Divisions Concerning Knowledge of the Climes")
  - Abu al-Fida (Abulfeda, 1273–1331): Taqwīm al-Buldān ("Correct Account of the Lands")
  - (probably) Hafiz-i Abru (died 1430)

=== Others ===
- Al-Kindi (Alkindus, 801–873)
- Ya'qubi (died 897)
- Al-Dinawari (820–898)
- Hamdani (893–945)
- Ibn al-Faqih (10th century)
- Ahmad ibn Fadlan (10th century)
- Ibn al-Haytham (Alhazen, 965–1039)
- Abū Rayhān Bīrūnī (973–1048)
- Ibn Sina (Avicenna, 980–1037)
- Muhammad al-Idrisi (Dreses, 1100–1165)
- Ibn Jubayr (1145–1217)
- Yaqut al-Hamawi (1179–1229)
- Hamdollah Mostowfi (1281–1349)
- Ibn al-Wardi (d. 1457)
- Ibn Battuta (1304–1370s)
- Ibn Khaldun (1332–1406)
- Ahmad Bin Majid (born 1432)
- Mahmud al-Kashgari (1005–1102)
- Piri Reis (1465–1554)
- Amin Razi (16th century)

== Gallery ==
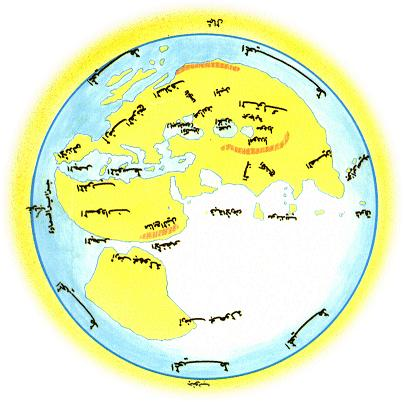
Al-Masudi's world map (10th century)

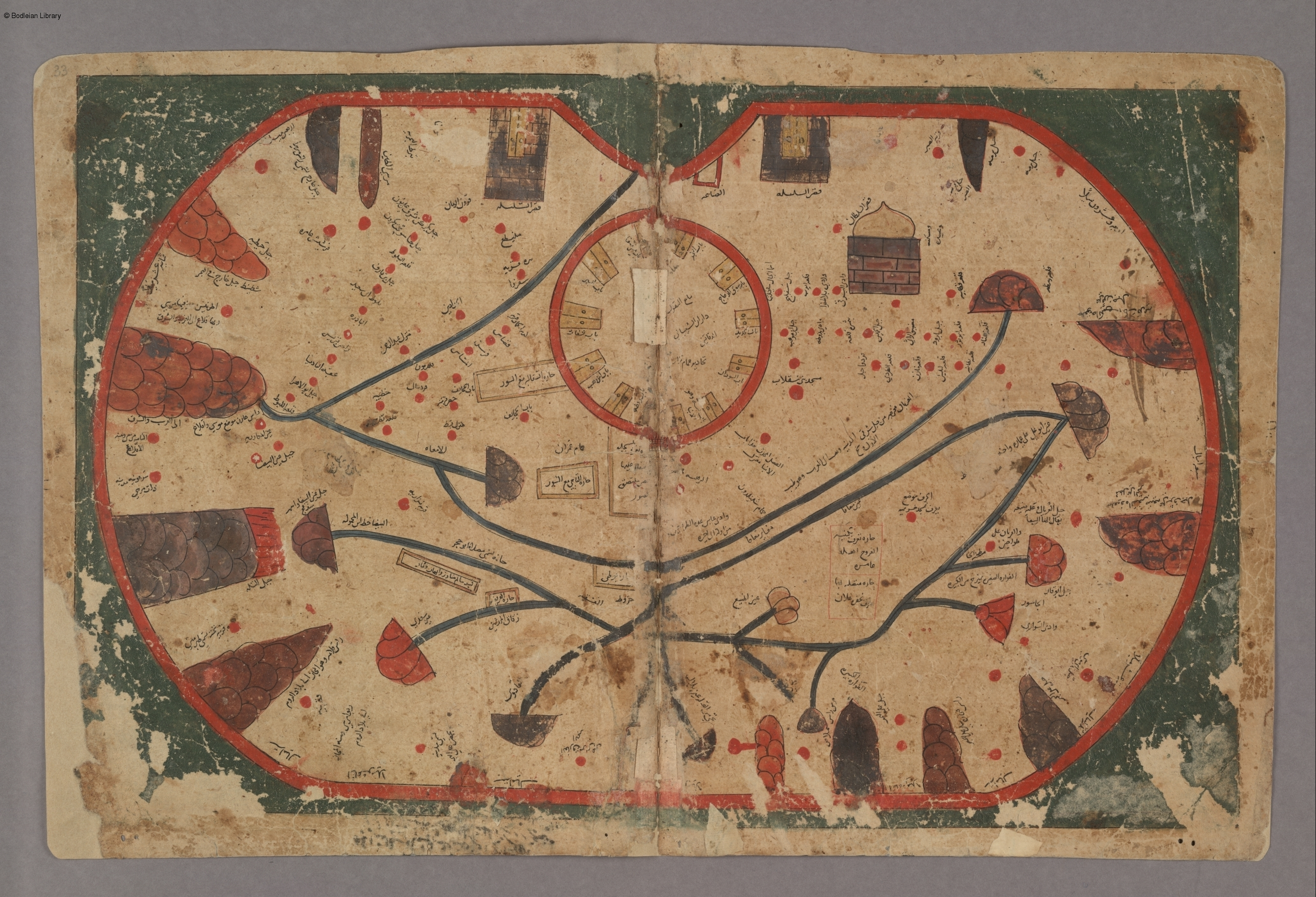
Schematic map of Sicily in the Arabic Book of Curiosities

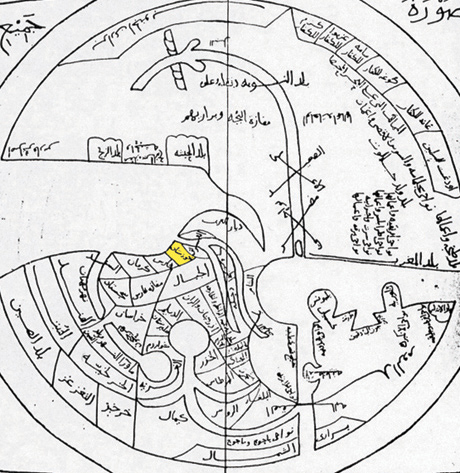
10th century map of the World by Ibn Hawqal.

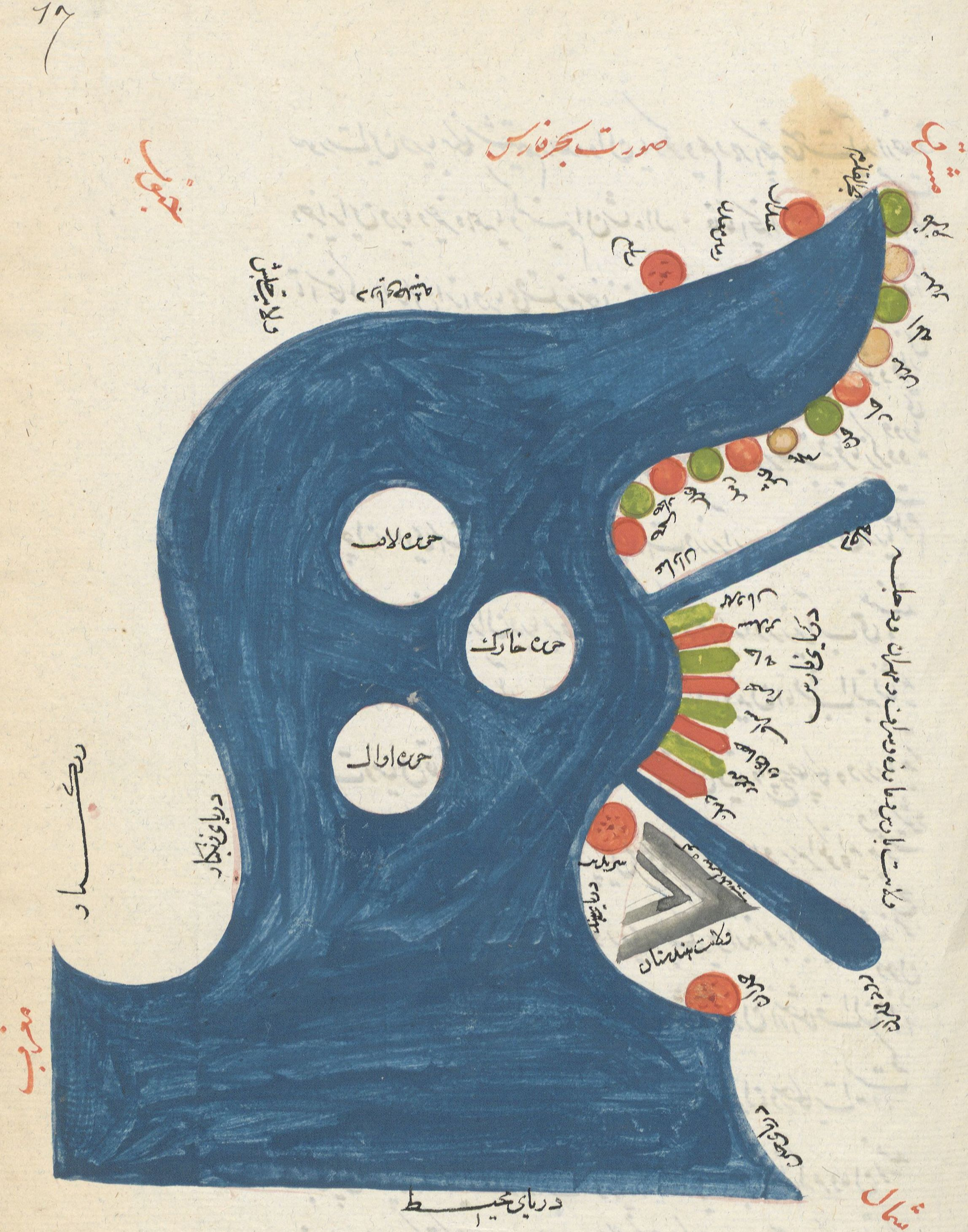
The Persian Gulf in a regional map of the Atlas of Islam

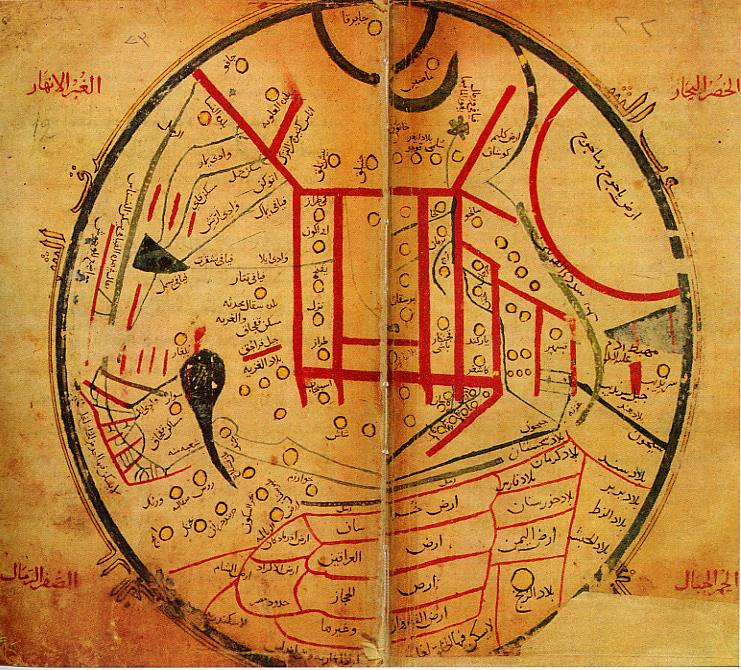
Map from Mahmud al-Kashgari's Diwan (11th century)

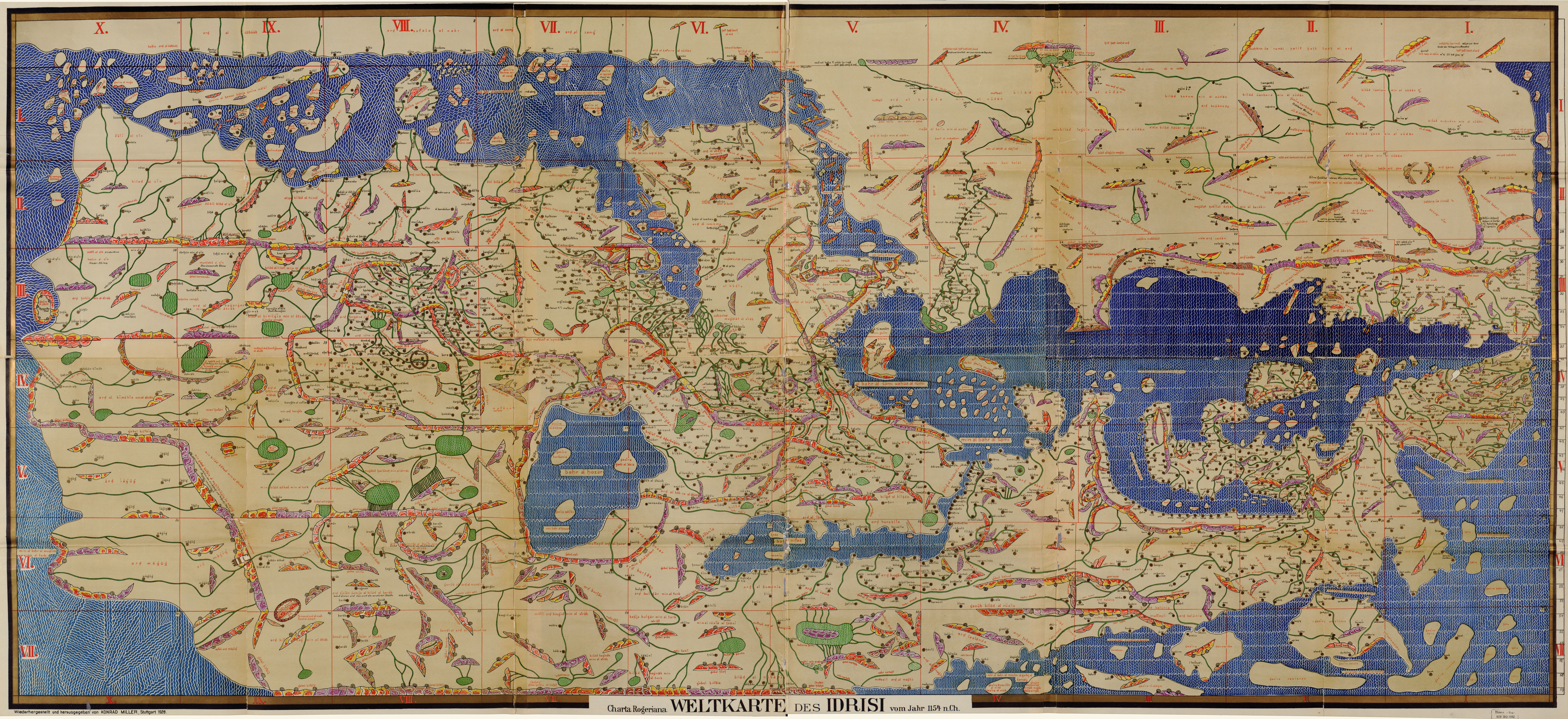
Muhammad al-Idrisi's Tabula Rogeriana (1154), one of the most advanced early world maps

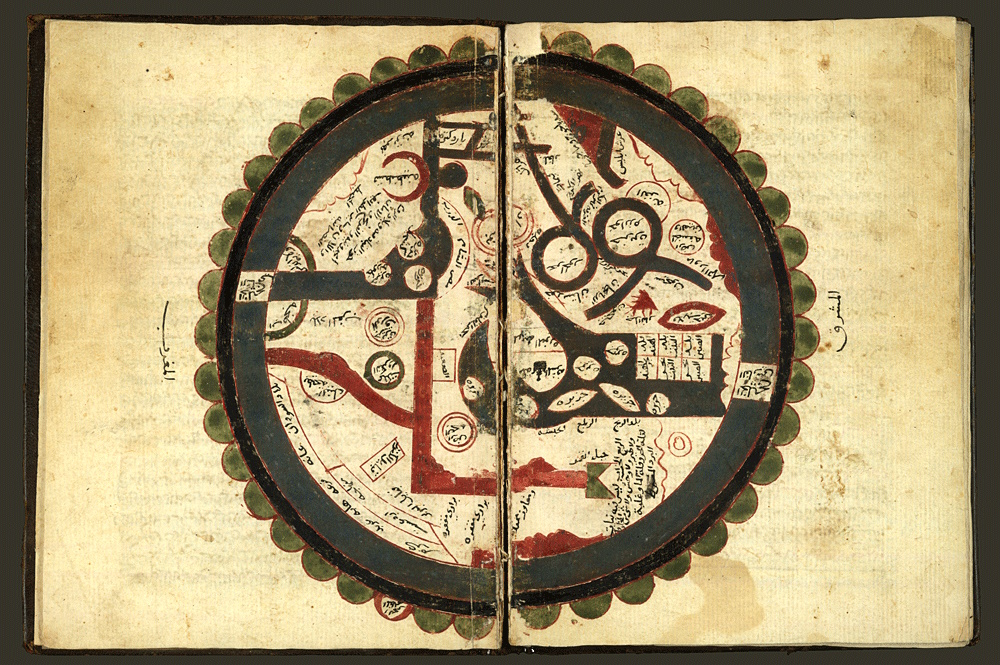
Ibn al-Wardi's atlas of the world (~1450), a manuscript copied in the 17th century

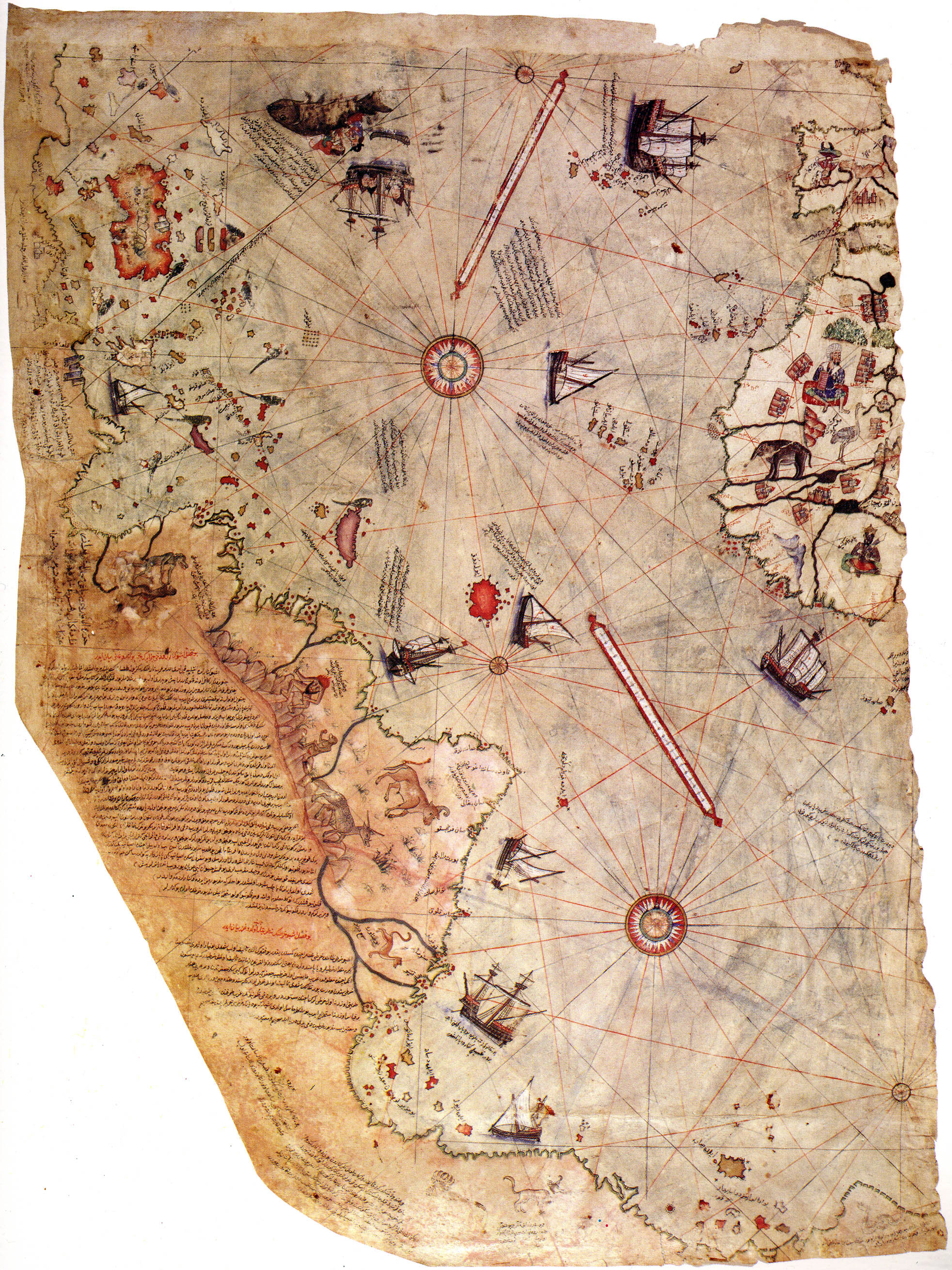
Surviving fragment of the first World Map of Piri Reis (1513) showing parts of the Americas

== See also ==
- History of geography
- History of cartography
- Cartography of Palestine
