= Buzhgan =

Coordinates: 35°10′N 60°44′E

Būzghān (Persian: بوژگان) (also Puchkan, Buzjan) is a village in Torbat-e-Jam County in Iran's Khorasan-e Razavi province. Historically Buzghan was a city and was the seat of government in the historic Persian province of Jam (Zam).

== Notable residents ==
- Abu al-Wafa' Buzjani, one of the most important Persian astronomers and mathematicians
- Abuzar Buzjani, Persian poet
