= Abuzar Buzjani =

Abuzar Buzjani (also spelled Abudarr Buzjani, in Persian:ابوذر بوزجانی - died 977 or 978) was a Persian poet and Sufi shaikh contemporary with Sebüktigin, the founder of the Ghaznavid Empire in ancient Iran. Abūzar was born and lived in Būzǰān. According to Jami he worked wonders, and died in 366-67/977. He is not discussed in other sources. Two Persian and one Arabic bayt are the only quotations from his works remaining.
