= Karl Mollweide =

German mathematician and astronomer (1774–1825)

- Born: Karl Brandan Mollweide; 3 February 1774; Wolfenbüttel, Duchy of Brunswick-Lüneburg, Holy Roman Empire
- Died: 10 March 1825 (aged 51); Leipzig, Kingdom of Saxony
- Occupations: Mathematician, astronomer

Karl Brandan Mollweide (3 February 1774 – 10 March 1825) was a German mathematician and astronomer who taught in Halle and Leipzig. In trigonometry, he rediscovered the formula now known as Mollweide's formula. He invented a map projection called the Mollweide projection.

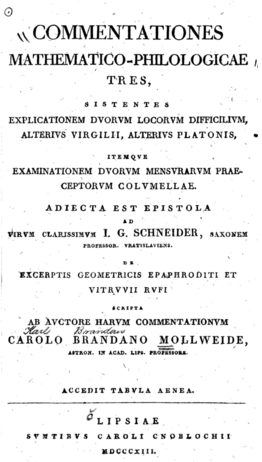
Karl Mollweide
