= Habash al-Hasib =

Persian polymath (died c. 869 CE)

- حبش الحاسب
- Born: Ahmad ibn ‘Abdallah al-Marwazi; Merv, Abbasid Caliphate
- Died: Between 864–874 (aged 100); Possibly in Abbasid Samarra, Abbasid Caliphate
- Known for: tangent and cotangent, Kepler's equation
- Children: Abu Ja'far ibn Habash
- Scientific career
- Fields: Astronomy

Ahmad ibn 'Abdallah al-Marwazi, known as Habash al-Hasib (Persian: حبش الحاسب, lit. 'Abyssinian calculator', died c. 869) was a Persian astronomer, geographer, and mathematician from Merv in Khorasan, who discovered the trigonometric ratios tangent, and cotangent. Al-Biruni who cited Habash in his work, expanded his astronomical tables.

Habash al-Hasib flourished in Baghdad, and died a centenarian some time between 864 and 874 possibly in Abbasid Samarra. The title "Habash" (Abbyssian) may refer to dark skin color. He worked under two Abbasid caliphs, al-Ma'mun and al-Mu'tasim.

Habash al-Hasib developed a trigonometric algorithm to solve problems related to parallax, which was later rediscovered by Johannes Kepler in 1609 and it is now known as Kepler's equation.

Habash al-Hasib is the father of the astronomer Abu Ja'far ibn Habash.

== Work ==
Habash Hasib made astronomical observations from 825 to 835, and compiled three zijes (astronomical tables): the first were still in the Hindu manner; the second, called the "tested" tables, were the most important; they are likely identical with the "Ma'munic" or "Arabic" tables and may be a collective work of al-Ma'mun's astronomers; the third, called tables of the Shah, were smaller.

Apropos of the solar eclipse of 829, Habash gives us the first instance of a determination of time by an altitude (in this case, of the sun); a method which was generally adopted by Muslim astronomers.

In 860, he seems to have introduced the notion of "shadow", umbra (versa), equivalent to our tangent in trigonometry, and he compiled a table of such shadows which seems to be the earliest of its kind. He also introduced the cotangent, and produced the first tables of for it.

=== The Book of Bodies and Distances ===
Habash al-Hasib conducted various observations at the Al-Shammisiyyah observatory in Baghdad and estimated a number of geographic and astronomical values. He compiled his results in The Book of Bodies and Distances (Kitāb al-ajrām wa-l-ab 'ād), in which some of his results included the following:

Earth

- Earth's circumference: 20,160 miles (32,444 km)
- Earth's diameter: 6414.54 miles (10323.201 km)
- Earth radius: 3207.275 miles (5161.609 km)

Moon

- Moon's diameter: 1886.8 miles (3036.5 km)
- Moon's circumference: 5927.025 miles (9538.622 km)
- Radius of closest distance of Moon: 215,208;9,9 (sexagesimal) miles
- Half-circumference of closest distance of Moon: 676,368;28,45,25,43 (sexagesimal) miles
- Radius of furthest distance of Moon: 205,800;8,45 (sexagesimal) miles
- Diameter of furthest distance of Moon: 411,600.216 miles (662,406.338 km)
- Circumference of furthest distance of Moon: 1,293,600.916 miles (2,081,848.873 km)

Sun

- Sun's diameter: 35,280;1,30 miles (56,777.6966 km)
- Sun's circumference: 110,880;4,43 miles (178,444.189 km)
- Diameter of orbit of Sun: 7,761,605.5 miles (12,491,093.2 km)
- Circumference of orbit of Sun: 24,392,571.38 miles (39,256,038 km)
- One degree along orbit of Sun: 67,700.05 miles (108,952.67 km)
- One minute along orbit of Sun: 1129.283 miles (1817.405 km)

== See also ==
- List of Muslim scientists
- List of pre-modern Iranian scientists and scholars
