= Mollweide's formula =

Trigonometric relation between sides and angles of a triangle

Figure 1 – A triangle. The angles α, β, and γ are respectively opposite the sides a, b, and c.

In trigonometry, Mollweide's formula is a pair of relationships between sides and angles in a triangle.

A variant of one of the expressions in more geometrical style was first published by Isaac Newton in 1707. Both relations were published by Friedrich Wilhelm von Oppel in 1746, and then by Thomas Simpson in 1748. Karl Mollweide republished the same result in 1808 without citing those predecessors.

It can be used to check the consistency of solutions of triangles.

Let $a,$ $b,$ and $c$ be the lengths of the three sides of a triangle. Let $\alpha,$ $\beta,$ and $\gamma$ be the measures of the angles opposite those three sides respectively. Mollweide's formulas are

$$\begin{align}
\frac{a + b} c
= \frac
{\cos\tfrac12(\alpha - \beta)}
{\sin\tfrac12\gamma}, \\[10mu]
\frac{a - b} c
= \frac
{\sin\tfrac12(\alpha - \beta)}
{\cos\tfrac12\gamma}.
\end{align}$$

== Relation to other trigonometric identities ==
Because in a planar triangle $\tfrac12\gamma = \tfrac12\pi - \tfrac12(\alpha + \beta),$ these identities can alternately be written in a form in which they are more clearly a limiting case of Napier's analogies for spherical triangles (this was the form used by Von Oppel),

$$\begin{align}
\frac{a + b} c
&= \frac
{\cos\tfrac12(\alpha - \beta)}
{\cos\tfrac12(\alpha + \beta)}, \\[10mu]
\frac{a - b} c
&= \frac
{\sin\tfrac12(\alpha - \beta)}
{\sin\tfrac12(\alpha + \beta)}.
\end{align}$$

Dividing one by the other to eliminate $c$ results in the law of tangents,

$$\begin{align}
\frac{a + b}{a - b}
= \frac
{\tan\tfrac12(\alpha + \beta)}
{\tan\tfrac12(\alpha - \beta)}.
\end{align}$$

In terms of half-angle tangents alone, Mollweide's formula can be written as

$$\begin{align}
\frac{a + b} c
&= \frac
{1 + \tan\tfrac12\alpha\,\tan\tfrac12\beta}
{1 - \tan\tfrac12\alpha\,\tan\tfrac12\beta}, \\[10mu]
\frac{a - b} c
&= \frac
{\tan\tfrac12\alpha - \tan\tfrac12\beta}
{\tan\tfrac12\alpha + \tan\tfrac12\beta},
\end{align}$$

or equivalently

$$\begin{align}
\tan\tfrac12\alpha\,\tan\tfrac12\beta
&= \frac
{a + b - c}
{a + b + c}, \\[10mu]
\frac
{\tan\tfrac12\alpha}
{\tan\tfrac12\beta}
&= \frac
{\phantom{-}a - b + c}
{-a + b + c}.
\end{align}$$

Multiplying the respective sides of these identities gives one half-angle tangent in terms of the three sides,

$$\bigl({\tan\tfrac12\alpha}\bigr)^2
= \frac
{(a + b - c)(a - b + c)}
{(a + b + c)(-a + b + c)}.$$

which becomes the law of cotangents after taking the square root,

$$\frac
{\cot\tfrac12\alpha}
{s - a}
= \frac
{\cot\tfrac12\beta}
{s - b}
= \frac
{\cot\tfrac12\gamma}
{s - c}
= \sqrt{\frac
{s\vphantom{)}}
{(s - c)(s - b)(s - a)}}=\frac{1}{r},$$

where $s = \tfrac12(a + b + c)$ is the semiperimeter and $r$ the incircle radius.

The identities can also be proven equivalent to the law of sines and law of cosines.

== Dual relations ==
In spherical trigonometry, the law of cosines and derived identities such as Napier's analogies have precise duals swapping central angles measuring the sides and dihedral angles at the vertices. In the infinitesimal limit, the law of cosines for sides reduces to the planar law of cosines and two of Napier's analogies reduce to Mollweide's formulas above. But the law of cosines for angles degenerates to $0 = 0.$ By dividing squared side length by the spherical excess $E,$ we obtain a non-vanishing ratio, the spherical trigonometry relation:

$$\begin{align}
\frac{\tan^2\tfrac12c}{\tan\tfrac12E}
= \frac
{\sin\gamma}{\sin\alpha\,\sin\beta}.
\end{align}$$

In the infinitesimal limit, as the half-angle tangents of spherical sides reduce to lengths of planar sides, the half-angle tangent of spherical excess reduces to twice the area $A$ of a planar triangle, so on the plane this is:

$$\frac{c^2}{2A} = \frac{\sin\gamma}{\sin\alpha\,\sin\beta},$$

and likewise for $a$ and $b.$

As corollaries (multiplying or dividing the above formula in terms of $a$ and $b$) we obtain two dual statements to Mollweide's formulas. The first expresses the area in terms of two sides and the included angle, and the other is the law of sines:

$$\frac{ab}{2A} = \frac{1}{\sin\gamma},$$

$$\frac{a}{b} = \frac {\sin\alpha}{\sin\beta}.$$

We can alternately express the second formula in a form closer to one of Mollweide's formulas (again the law of tangents):

$$\frac{\tan\tfrac12(\alpha - \beta)}{\cot\tfrac12\gamma} = \frac{a - b}{a + b}.$$

== Cyclic quadrilateral ==
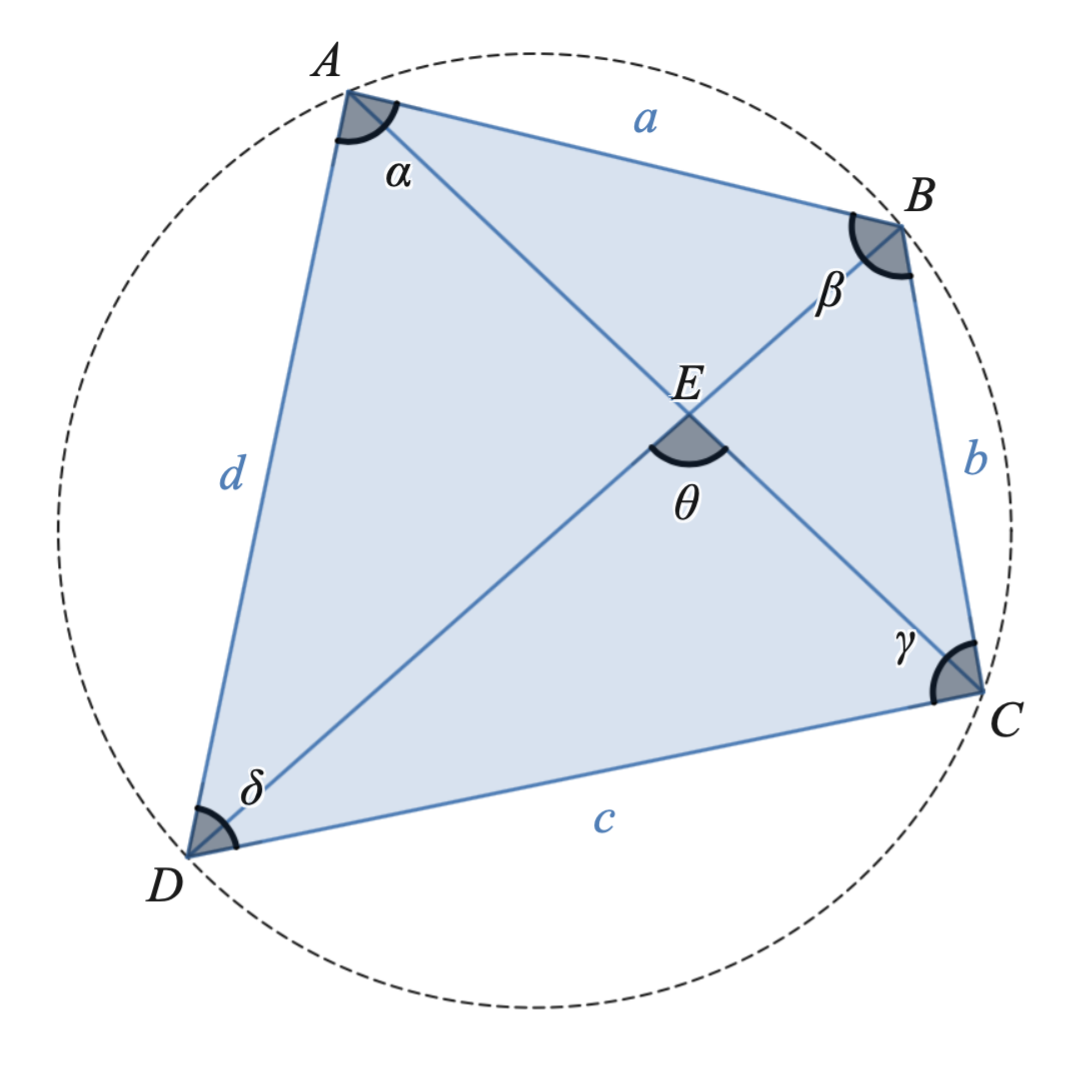
Any cyclic quadrilateral satisfies a generalization of Mollweide's formula.

A generalization of Mollweide's formula holds for a cyclic quadrilateral $\square ABCD.$ Denote the lengths of sides $|AB| = a,$ $|BC| = b,$ $|CD| = c,$ and $|DA| = d$ and angle measures $\angle{DAB} = \alpha,$ $\angle{ABC} = \beta,$ $\angle{BCD} = \gamma,$ and $\angle{CDA} = \delta.$ If $E$ is the point of intersection of the diagonals, denote $\angle{CED} = \theta.$ Then:

$$\begin{align}
\frac{a+c}{b+d}
&= \frac{\sin\tfrac12(\alpha+\beta)}{\cos\tfrac12(\gamma-\delta)}\tan\tfrac12\theta, \\[10mu]
\frac{a-c}{b-d}
&= \frac{\cos\tfrac12(\alpha+\beta)}{\sin\tfrac12(\delta-\gamma)}\cot\tfrac12\theta.
\end{align}$$

Several variant formulas can be constructed by substituting based on the cyclic quadrilateral identities,

$$\begin{align}
\sin\tfrac12(\alpha+\beta) = \phantom-\cos\tfrac12(\beta-\gamma)
= \phantom-\sin\tfrac12(\gamma+\delta) = \cos\tfrac12(\delta-\alpha), \\[3mu]
\cos\tfrac12(\alpha+\beta) = -\sin\tfrac12(\beta-\gamma)
= -\cos\tfrac12(\gamma+\delta) = \sin\tfrac12(\delta-\alpha).
\end{align}$$

As rational relationships in terms of half-angle tangents of two adjacent angles, these formulas can be written:

$$\begin{align}
\frac{a+c}{b+d}
&= \frac{\tan\tfrac12\alpha +  \tan\tfrac12\beta}
{1 + \tan\tfrac12\alpha\, \tan\tfrac12\beta}\tan\tfrac12\theta, \\[10mu]
\frac{b-d}{a-c}
&= \frac{\tan\tfrac12\alpha - \tan\tfrac12\beta}
{1 - \tan\tfrac12\alpha\, \tan\tfrac12\beta}\tan\tfrac12\theta.
\end{align}$$

A triangle may be regarded as a quadrilateral with one side of length zero. From this perspective, as $d$ approaches zero, a cyclic quadrilateral converges into a triangle $\triangle A'B'C',$ and the formulas above simplify to the analogous triangle formulas. Relabeling to match the convention for triangles, in the limit $a' = b,$ $b' = c,$ $c' = a,$ $\alpha' = \alpha + \delta - \pi = \pi - \theta,$ $\beta' = \beta,$ and $\gamma' = \gamma.$
