= List of trigonometric identities =

In trigonometry, trigonometric identities are equalities that involve trigonometric functions and are true for every value of the occurring variables for which both sides of the equality are defined. Geometrically, these are identities involving certain functions of one or more angles. They are distinct from triangle identities, which are identities potentially involving angles but also involving side lengths or other lengths of a triangle.

These identities are useful whenever expressions involving trigonometric functions need to be simplified. An important application is the integration of non-trigonometric functions: a common technique involves first using the substitution rule with a trigonometric function, and then simplifying the resulting integral with a trigonometric identity.

== Pythagorean identities ==
Trigonometric functions and their reciprocals on the unit circle. All of the right-angled triangles are similar, i.e. the ratios between their corresponding sides are the same. For sin, cos and tan the unit-length radius forms the hypotenuse of the triangle that defines them. The reciprocal identities arise as ratios of sides in the triangles where this unit line is no longer the hypotenuse. The triangle shaded blue illustrates the identity $1 + \cot^2\theta = \csc^2\theta$, and the red triangle shows that $\tan^2\theta + 1 = \sec^2\theta$.

The basic relationship between the sine and cosine is given by the Pythagorean identity:

$$\sin^2\theta + \cos^2\theta = 1,$$

where $\sin^2 \theta$ means ${(\sin \theta)}^2$ and $\cos^2 \theta$ means ${(\cos \theta)}^2.$

This can be viewed as a version of the Pythagorean theorem, and follows from the equation $x^2 + y^2 = 1$ for the unit circle. This equation can be solved for either the sine or the cosine:

$$\begin{align}
\sin\theta &= \pm \sqrt{1 - \cos^2\theta}, \\
\cos\theta &= \pm \sqrt{1 - \sin^2\theta}.
\end{align}$$

where the sign depends on the quadrant of $\theta.$

Dividing this identity by $\sin^2 \theta$, $\cos^2 \theta$, or both yields the following identities:
$$\begin{align}
1 + \cot^2\theta &= \csc^2\theta \\
1 + \tan^2\theta &= \sec^2\theta \\
\sec^2\theta + \csc^2\theta &= \sec^2\theta\csc^2\theta
\end{align}$$

Using these identities, it is possible to express any trigonometric function in terms of any other (up to a plus or minus sign):

Each trigonometric function in terms of each of the other five.
in terms of → ↓	$\sin \theta$	$\csc \theta$	$\cos \theta$	$\sec \theta$	$\tan \theta$	$\cot \theta$
$\sin \theta =$	$\sin \theta$	$\frac{1}{\csc \theta}$	$\pm\sqrt{1 - \cos^2 \theta}$	$\pm\frac{\sqrt{\sec^2 \theta - 1}}{\sec \theta}$	$\pm\frac{\tan \theta}{\sqrt{1 + \tan^2 \theta}}$	$\pm\frac{1}{\sqrt{1 + \cot^2 \theta}}$
$\csc \theta =$	$\frac{1}{\sin \theta}$	$\csc \theta$	$\pm\frac{1}{\sqrt{1 - \cos^2 \theta}}$	$\pm\frac{\sec \theta}{\sqrt{\sec^2 \theta - 1}}$	$\pm\frac{\sqrt{1 + \tan^2 \theta}}{\tan \theta}$	$\pm\sqrt{1 + \cot^2 \theta}$
$\cos \theta =$	$\pm\sqrt{1 - \sin^2\theta}$	$\pm\frac{\sqrt{\csc^2 \theta - 1}}{\csc \theta}$	$\cos \theta$	$\frac{1}{\sec \theta}$	$\pm\frac{1}{\sqrt{1 + \tan^2 \theta}}$	$\pm\frac{\cot \theta}{\sqrt{1 + \cot^2 \theta}}$
$\sec \theta =$	$\pm\frac{1}{\sqrt{1 - \sin^2 \theta}}$	$\pm\frac{\csc \theta}{\sqrt{\csc^2 \theta - 1}}$	$\frac{1}{\cos \theta}$	$\sec \theta$	$\pm\sqrt{1 + \tan^2 \theta}$	$\pm\frac{\sqrt{1 + \cot^2 \theta}}{\cot \theta}$
$\tan \theta =$	$\pm\frac{\sin \theta}{\sqrt{1 - \sin^2 \theta}}$	$\pm\frac{1}{\sqrt{\csc^2 \theta - 1}}$	$\pm\frac{\sqrt{1 - \cos^2 \theta}}{\cos \theta}$	$\pm\sqrt{\sec^2 \theta - 1}$	$\tan \theta$	$\frac{1}{\cot \theta}$
$\cot \theta =$	$\pm\frac{\sqrt{1 - \sin^2 \theta}}{\sin \theta}$	$\pm\sqrt{\csc^2 \theta - 1}$	$\pm\frac{\cos \theta}{\sqrt{1 - \cos^2 \theta}}$	$\pm\frac{1}{\sqrt{\sec^2 \theta - 1}}$	$\frac{1}{\tan \theta}$	$\cot \theta$

== Reflections, shifts, and periodicity ==
By examining the unit circle, one can establish the following properties of the trigonometric functions.

=== Reflections ===
Transformation of coordinates (a,b) when shifting the reflection angle $\alpha$ in increments of $\frac{\pi}{4}$

When the direction of a Euclidean vector is represented by an angle $\theta,$ this is the angle determined by the free vector (starting at the origin) and the positive $x$-unit vector. The same concept may also be applied to lines in an Euclidean space, where the angle is that determined by a parallel to the given line through the origin and the positive $x$-axis. If a line (vector) with direction $\theta$ is reflected about a line with direction $\alpha,$ then the direction angle $\theta^{\prime}$ of this reflected line (vector) has the value
$$\theta^{\prime} = 2 \alpha - \theta.$$

The values of the trigonometric functions of these angles $\theta,\;\theta^{\prime}$ for specific angles $\alpha$ satisfy simple identities: either they are equal, or have opposite signs, or employ the complementary trigonometric function. These are also known as reduction formulae.

$\theta$ reflected in $\alpha = 0$ odd/even identities	$\theta$ reflected in $\alpha = \frac{\pi}{4}$ complementary angles	$\theta$ reflected in $\alpha = \frac{\pi}{2}$ supplementary angles	$\theta$ reflected in $\alpha = \frac{3\pi}{4}$	$\theta$ reflected in $\alpha = \pi$ conjugate angles; compare to $\alpha = 0$
$\sin(-\theta) = -\sin \theta$	$\sin\left(\tfrac{\pi}{2} - \theta\right) =\cos \theta$	$\sin(\pi - \theta) = +\sin \theta$	$\sin\left(\tfrac{3\pi}{2} - \theta\right) =-\cos \theta$	$\sin(2\pi - \theta) = -\sin(\theta) = \sin(-\theta)$
$\cos(-\theta) =+ \cos \theta$	$\cos\left(\tfrac{\pi}{2} - \theta\right) = \sin \theta$	$\cos(\pi - \theta) = -\cos \theta$	$\cos\left(\tfrac{3\pi}{2} - \theta\right) = -\sin \theta$	$\cos(2\pi - \theta) = +\cos(\theta) = \cos(-\theta)$
$\tan(-\theta) = -\tan \theta$	$\tan\left(\tfrac{\pi}{2} - \theta\right) = \cot \theta$	$\tan(\pi - \theta) = -\tan \theta$	$\tan\left(\tfrac{3\pi}{2} - \theta\right) = +\cot \theta$	$\tan(2\pi - \theta) = -\tan(\theta) = \tan(-\theta)$
$\csc(-\theta) = -\csc \theta$	$\csc\left(\tfrac{\pi}{2} - \theta\right) = \sec \theta$	$\csc(\pi - \theta) =+ \csc \theta$	$\csc\left(\tfrac{3\pi}{2} - \theta\right) = -\sec \theta$	$\csc(2\pi - \theta) = -\csc(\theta) = \csc(-\theta)$
$\sec(-\theta) = +\sec \theta$	$\sec\left(\tfrac{\pi}{2} - \theta\right) = \csc \theta$	$\sec(\pi - \theta) = -\sec \theta$	$\sec\left(\tfrac{3\pi}{2} - \theta\right) = -\csc \theta$	$\sec(2\pi - \theta) = +\sec(\theta) = \sec(-\theta)$
$\cot(-\theta) = -\cot \theta$	$\cot\left(\tfrac{\pi}{2} - \theta\right) = \tan \theta$	$\cot(\pi - \theta) = -\cot \theta$	$\cot\left(\tfrac{3\pi}{2} - \theta\right) = +\tan \theta$	$\cot(2\pi - \theta) = -\cot(\theta) = \cot(-\theta)$

=== Shifts and periodicity ===
Transformation of coordinates (a,b) when shifting the angle $\theta$ in increments of $\frac{\pi}{2}$

Shift by one quarter period orthogonal angles	Shift by one half period opposite angles	Shift by full periods coincident angles	Period
$\sin(\theta \pm \tfrac{\pi}{2}) = \pm\cos \theta$	$\sin(\theta + \pi) = -\sin \theta$	$\sin(\theta + k\cdot 2\pi) = +\sin \theta$	$2\pi$
$\cos(\theta \pm \tfrac{\pi}{2}) = \mp\sin \theta$	$\cos(\theta + \pi) = -\cos \theta$	$\cos(\theta + k\cdot 2\pi) = +\cos \theta$	$2\pi$
$\csc(\theta \pm \tfrac{\pi}{2}) = \pm\sec \theta$	$\csc(\theta + \pi) = -\csc \theta$	$\csc(\theta + k\cdot 2\pi) = +\csc \theta$	$2\pi$
$\sec(\theta \pm \tfrac{\pi}{2}) = \mp\csc \theta$	$\sec(\theta + \pi) = -\sec \theta$	$\sec(\theta + k\cdot 2\pi) = +\sec \theta$	$2\pi$
$\tan(\theta \pm \tfrac{\pi}{4}) = \tfrac{\tan \theta \pm 1}{1\mp \tan \theta}$	$\tan(\theta + \tfrac{\pi}{2}) = -\cot \theta$	$\tan(\theta + k\cdot \pi) = +\tan \theta$	$\pi$
$\cot(\theta \pm \tfrac{\pi}{4}) = \tfrac{\cot \theta \mp 1}{1\pm \cot \theta}$	$\cot(\theta + \tfrac{\pi}{2}) = -\tan\theta$	$\cot(\theta + k\cdot \pi) = +\cot \theta$	$\pi$

=== Signs ===
The sign of trigonometric functions depends on quadrant of the angle. If ${-\pi} < \theta \leq \pi$ and sgn is the sign function,

$$\begin{align}
\sgn(\sin \theta) = \sgn(\csc \theta) &= \begin{cases}
+1 & \text{if}\ \  0 < \theta < \pi \\
-1 & \text{if}\ \  {-\pi} < \theta < 0 \\
0 & \text{if}\ \  \theta \in \{0, \pi \}
\end{cases}
\\[5mu]
\sgn(\cos \theta) = \sgn(\sec \theta) &= \begin{cases}
+1 & \text{if}\ \  {-\tfrac{\pi}{2}} < \theta < \tfrac{\pi}{2} \\
-1 & \text{if}\ \  {-\pi} < \theta < -\tfrac{\pi}{2} \ \ \text{or}\ \ \tfrac{\pi}{2} < \theta < \pi\\
0 & \text{if}\ \  \theta \in \bigl\{{-\tfrac{\pi}{2}}, \tfrac{\pi}{2} \bigr\}
\end{cases}
\\[5mu]
\sgn(\tan \theta) = \sgn(\cot \theta) &= \begin{cases}
+1 & \text{if}\ \  {-\pi} < \theta < -\tfrac{\pi}{2} \ \ \text{or}\ \ 0 < \theta < \tfrac{\pi}{2} \\
-1 & \text{if}\ \  {-\tfrac{\pi}{2}} < \theta < 0 \ \ \text{or}\ \ \tfrac{\pi}{2} < \theta < \pi \\
0 & \text{if}\ \  \theta \in \bigl\{{-\tfrac{\pi}{2}}, 0, \tfrac{\pi}{2}, \pi \bigr\}
\end{cases}
\end{align}$$

The trigonometric functions are periodic with common period $2\pi,$ so for values of θ outside the interval $({-\pi}, \pi],$ they take repeating values (see § Shifts and periodicity above). The sign of a sinusoid or cosinusoid can be used to define a normalized square wave. For example, the functions $\sgn(\sin x)$ and $\sgn(\cos x)$ take values ±1 and correspond to square waves with a phase shift of π/2.

== Angle sum and difference identities ==
Geometric construction to derive angle sum trigonometric identities

Diagram showing the angle difference identities for $\sin(\alpha - \beta)$ and $\cos(\alpha - \beta)$

These are also known as the angle addition and subtraction theorems (or formulae).
$$\begin{align}
\sin(\alpha + \beta) &= \sin \alpha \cos \beta + \cos \alpha \sin \beta \\
\sin(\alpha - \beta) &= \sin \alpha \cos \beta - \cos \alpha \sin \beta \\
\cos(\alpha + \beta) &= \cos \alpha \cos \beta - \sin \alpha \sin \beta \\
\cos(\alpha - \beta) &= \cos \alpha \cos \beta + \sin \alpha \sin \beta
\end{align}$$

The angle difference identities for $\sin(\alpha - \beta)$ and $\cos(\alpha - \beta)$ can be derived from the angle sum versions (and vice versa) by substituting $-\beta$ for $\beta$ and using the facts that $\sin(-\beta) = -\sin(\beta)$ and $\cos(-\beta) = \cos(\beta)$ They can also be derived by using a slightly modified version of the figure for the angle sum identities, both of which are shown here. They can also be seen as expressing the dot product and cross product of two vectors in terms of the cosine and the sine of the angle between them.

These identities are summarized in the first two rows of the following table, which also includes sum and difference identities for the other trigonometric functions.

Sine	$\sin(\alpha \pm \beta)$	$=$	$\sin \alpha \cos \beta \pm \cos \alpha \sin \beta$
Cosine	$\cos(\alpha \pm \beta)$	$=$	$\cos \alpha \cos \beta \mp \sin \alpha \sin \beta$
Tangent	$\tan(\alpha \pm \beta)$	$=$	$\frac{\tan \alpha \pm \tan \beta}{1 \mp \tan \alpha \tan \beta}$
Cosecant	$\csc(\alpha \pm \beta)$	$=$	$\frac{\sec \alpha \sec \beta \csc \alpha \csc \beta}{\sec \alpha \csc \beta \pm \csc \alpha \sec \beta}$
Secant	$\sec(\alpha \pm \beta)$	$=$	$\frac{\sec \alpha \sec \beta \csc \alpha \csc \beta}{\csc \alpha \csc \beta \mp \sec \alpha \sec \beta}$
Cotangent	$\cot(\alpha \pm \beta)$	$=$	$\frac{\cot \alpha \cot \beta \mp 1}{\cot \beta \pm \cot \alpha}$
Arcsine	$\arcsin x \pm \arcsin y$	$=$	$\arcsin\left(x\sqrt{1-y^2} \pm y\sqrt{1-x^2\vphantom{y}}\right)$
Arccosine	$\arccos x \pm \arccos y$	$=$	$\arccos\left(xy \mp \sqrt{\left(1-x^2\right)\left(1-y^2\right)}\right)$
Arctangent	$\arctan x \pm \arctan y$	$=$	$\arctan\left(\frac{x \pm y}{1 \mp xy}\right)$
Arccotangent	$\arccot x \pm \arccot y$	$=$	$\arccot\left(\frac{xy \mp 1}{y \pm x}\right)$

=== Sines and cosines of sums of infinitely many angles ===
When the series $\sum_{i=1}^\infty \theta_i$ converges absolutely then

$$\begin{align}
{\sin}\biggl(\sum_{i=1}^\infty \theta_i\biggl)
&= \sum_{\text{odd}\ k \ge 1} (-1)^\frac{k-1}{2} \!\!
\sum_{\begin{smallmatrix} A \subseteq \{\,1,2,3,\dots\,\} \\
\left|A\right| = k\end{smallmatrix}}
\biggl(\prod_{i \in A} \sin\theta_i \prod_{i \not \in A} \cos\theta_i\biggr) \\
{\cos}\biggl(\sum_{i=1}^\infty \theta_i\biggr)
&= \sum_{\text{even}\ k \ge 0} (-1)^\frac{k}{2} \,
\sum_{\begin{smallmatrix} A \subseteq \{\,1,2,3,\dots\,\} \\ \left|A\right| = k\end{smallmatrix}}
\biggl(\prod_{i \in A} \sin\theta_i \prod_{i \not \in A} \cos\theta_i\biggr) .
\end{align}$$

Because the series $\sum_{i=1}^\infty \theta_i$ converges absolutely, it is necessarily the case that $\lim_{i \to \infty} \theta_i = 0,$ $\lim_{i \to \infty} \sin \theta_i = 0,$ and $\lim_{i \to \infty} \cos \theta_i = 1.$ Particularly, in these two identities, an asymmetry appears that is not seen in the case of sums of finitely many angles: in each product, there are only finitely many sine factors but there are cofinitely many cosine factors. Terms with infinitely many sine factors would necessarily be equal to zero.

When only finitely many of the angles $\theta_i$ are nonzero then only finitely many of the terms on the right side are nonzero because all but finitely many sine factors vanish. Furthermore, in each term all but finitely many of the cosine factors are unity.

=== Tangents and cotangents of sums ===
Let $e_k$ (for $k = 0, 1, 2, 3, \ldots$) be the kth-degree elementary symmetric polynomial in the variables
$$x_i = \tan \theta_i$$
for $i = 0, 1, 2, 3, \ldots,$ that is,

$$\begin{align}
e_0 &= 1  \\[6pt]
e_1 &= \sum_i       x_i         &&= \sum_i       \tan\theta_i                 \\[6pt]
e_2 &= \sum_{i<j}   x_i x_j     &&= \sum_{i<j}   \tan\theta_i \tan\theta_j    \\[6pt]
e_3 &= \sum_{i<j<k} x_i x_j x_k &&= \sum_{i<j<k} \tan\theta_i \tan\theta_j \tan\theta_k \\
&\ \ \vdots                 &&\ \ \vdots
\end{align}$$

Then

$$\tan \Bigl(\sum_i \theta_i\Bigr)
= \frac{e_1 - e_3 + e_5 -\cdots}{e_0 - e_2 + e_4 - \cdots}.$$
This can be shown by using the sine and cosine sum formulae above:
$$\begin{align}
\tan \Bigl(\sum_i \theta_i\Bigr)
&= \frac{{\sin}\bigl(\sum_i \theta_i\bigr) / \prod_i \cos \theta_i}
{{\cos}\bigl(\sum_i \theta_i\bigr) / \prod_i \cos \theta_i} \\[10pt]
& = \frac
{\displaystyle
\sum_{\text{odd}\ k \ge 1} (-1)^\frac{k-1}{2}
\sum_{
\begin{smallmatrix} A \subseteq \{1,2,3,\dots\} \\
\left|A\right| = k\end{smallmatrix}}
\prod_{i \in A} \tan\theta_i}
{\displaystyle
\sum_{\text{even}\ k \ge 0} ~ (-1)^\frac{k}{2} ~~
\sum_{
\begin{smallmatrix} A \subseteq \{1,2,3,\dots\} \\
\left|A\right| = k\end{smallmatrix}}
\prod_{i \in A} \tan\theta_i}
= \frac{e_1 - e_3 + e_5 -\cdots}{e_0 - e_2 + e_4 - \cdots} \\[10pt]
\cot\Bigl(\sum_i \theta_i\Bigr)
&= \frac{e_0 - e_2 + e_4 - \cdots}{e_1 - e_3 + e_5 -\cdots}
\end{align}$$

The number of terms on the right side depends on the number of terms on the left side.

For example:
$$\begin{align}
\tan(\theta_1 + \theta_2) &
= \frac{ e_1 }{ e_0 - e_2 }
= \frac{ x_1 + x_2 }{ 1 \ - \ x_1 x_2 }
= \frac{ \tan\theta_1 + \tan\theta_2 }{ 1 \ - \ \tan\theta_1 \tan\theta_2 },
\\[8pt]
\tan(\theta_1 + \theta_2 + \theta_3) &
= \frac{ e_1 - e_3 }{ e_0 - e_2 }
= \frac{ (x_1 + x_2 + x_3) \ - \ (x_1 x_2 x_3) }{ 1 \ - \ (x_1x_2 + x_1 x_3 + x_2 x_3) },
\\[8pt]
\tan(\theta_1 + \theta_2 + \theta_3 + \theta_4) &
= \frac{ e_1 - e_3 }{ e_0 - e_2 + e_4 } \\[8pt] &
= \frac{ (x_1 + x_2 + x_3 + x_4) \ - \ (x_1 x_2 x_3 + x_1 x_2 x_4 + x_1 x_3 x_4 + x_2 x_3 x_4) }{ 1 \ - \ (x_1 x_2 + x_1 x_3 + x_1 x_4 + x_2 x_3 + x_2 x_4 + x_3 x_4) \ + \ (x_1 x_2 x_3 x_4) },
\end{align}$$

and so on. The case of only finitely many terms can be proved by mathematical induction. The case of infinitely many terms can be proved by using some elementary inequalities.

=== Linear fractional transformations of tangents, related to tangents of sums ===
Suppose $a,b,c,d,p,q\in\mathbb R$ and $i = \sqrt{-1}$ and

$$\frac{ai+b}{ci+d} = pi +q$$

and let $\varphi$ be any number for which $\tan\varphi = \tfrac{c}{d}.$ Suppose that $\tfrac{a}{c} \ne \tfrac{b}{d}$ so that the forgoing fraction cannot be 0/0. Then for all $\theta\in\mathbb R$

$$\frac{a\tan\theta + b}{c\tan\theta+d} = p\tan(\theta-\varphi) + q.$$

(In case the denominator of this fraction is 0, we take the value of the fraction to be $\infty$, where the symbol $\infty$ does not mean either $+\infty$ or $-\infty$, but is the $\infty$ that is approached by going in either the positive or the negative direction, making the completion of the line $\mathbb R \cup \{\,\infty\,\}$ topologically a circle.)

From this identity it can be shown to follow quickly that the family of all Cauchy-distributed random variables is closed under linear fractional transformations, a result known since 1976.

=== Secants and cosecants of sums ===
$$\begin{align}
{\sec}\Bigl(\sum_i \theta_i \Bigr) &= \frac{\prod_i \sec\theta_i}{e_0 - e_2 + e_4 - \cdots} \\[8pt]
{\csc}\Bigl(\sum_i \theta_i \Bigr) &= \frac{\prod_i \sec\theta_i }{e_1 - e_3 + e_5 - \cdots}
\end{align}$$

where $e_k$ is the kth-degree elementary symmetric polynomial in the n variables $x_i = \tan \theta_i,$ $i = 1, \ldots, n,$ and the number of terms in the denominator and the number of factors in the product in the numerator depend on the number of terms in the sum on the left. The case of only finitely many terms can be proved by mathematical induction on the number of such terms.

For example,

$$\begin{align}
\sec(\alpha+\beta+\gamma)
&= \frac{\sec\alpha \sec\beta \sec\gamma}
{1 - \tan\alpha\tan\beta - \tan\alpha\tan\gamma - \tan\beta\tan\gamma} \\[8pt]
\csc(\alpha+\beta+\gamma)
&= \frac{\sec\alpha \sec\beta \sec\gamma}
{\tan\alpha + \tan\beta + \tan\gamma - \tan\alpha\tan\beta\tan\gamma}.
\end{align}$$

=== Ptolemy's theorem ===
Diagram illustrating the relation between Ptolemy's theorem and the angle sum trig identity for sine. Ptolemy's theorem states that the sum of the products of the lengths of opposite sides is equal to the product of the lengths of the diagonals. When those side-lengths are expressed in terms of the sin and cos values shown in the figure above, this yields the angle sum trigonometric identity for sine: sin(α + β) = sin α cos β + cos α sin β.

Ptolemy's theorem is important in the history of trigonometric identities, as it is how results equivalent to the sum and difference formulas for sine and cosine were first proved (but expressed in terms of chords). It states that in a cyclic quadrilateral $ABCD$, as shown in the accompanying figure, the sum of the products of the lengths of opposite sides is equal to the product of the lengths of the diagonals. In the special cases of one of the diagonals or sides being a diameter of the circle, this theorem gives rise directly to the angle sum and difference trigonometric identities. The relationship follows most easily when the circle is constructed to have a diameter of length one, as shown here.

By Thales's theorem, $\angle DAB$ and $\angle DCB$ are both right angles. The right-angled triangles $DAB$ and $DCB$ both share the hypotenuse $\overline{BD}$ of length 1. Thus, the side $\overline{AB} = \sin \alpha$, $\overline{AD} = \cos \alpha$, $\overline{BC} = \sin \beta$ and $\overline{CD} = \cos \beta$.

By the inscribed angle theorem, the central angle subtended by the chord $\overline{AC}$ at the circle's center is twice the angle $\angle ADC$, i.e. $2(\alpha + \beta)$. Therefore, the symmetrical pair of red triangles each has the angle $\alpha + \beta$ at the center. Each of these triangles has a hypotenuse of length $\frac{1}{2}$, so the length of $\overline{AC}$ is $2 \times \frac{1}{2} \sin(\alpha + \beta)$, i.e. simply $\sin(\alpha + \beta)$. The quadrilateral's other diagonal is the diameter of length 1, so the product of the diagonals' lengths is also $\sin(\alpha + \beta)$.

When these values are substituted into the statement of Ptolemy's theorem that $|\overline{AC}|\cdot |\overline{BD}|=|\overline{AB}|\cdot |\overline{CD}|+|\overline{AD}|\cdot |\overline{BC}|$, this yields the angle sum trigonometric identity for sine: $\sin(\alpha + \beta) = \sin \alpha \cos \beta + \cos \alpha \sin \beta$. The angle difference formula for $\sin(\alpha - \beta)$ can be similarly derived by letting the side $\overline{CD}$ serve as a diameter instead of $\overline{BD}$.

== Multiple-angle and half-angle formulas ==
=== Multiple-angle formulae ===
==== Double-angle formulae ====
Visual demonstration of the double-angle formula for sine. For the above isosceles triangle with unit sides and angle 2θ, the area 1/2(base × height) is calculated in two orientations. When upright, the area is sin θ cos θ. When on its side, the same area is 1/2sin 2θ. Therefore, sin 2θ = 2sin θ cos θ.

Double-angle formulae, in terms of f(θ) (or cofunction) and tan(θ)
f(2θ)	Identity, f(θ) or cofunction	Identity, tan(θ)
$\sin(2\theta)$	$$\begin{align} &= 2 \sin\theta \cos\theta \\ &= (\sin\theta+\cos\theta)^2 - 1\end{align}$$	$= \frac{2\tan\theta}{1+\tan^2\theta}$
$\cos(2\theta)$	$$\begin{align} &= \cos^2\theta - \sin^2\theta \\ &= 2\cos^2\theta - 1 \\ &= 1 - 2\sin^2\theta \end{align}$$	$= \frac{1 - \tan^2\theta}{1 + \tan^2\theta}$
$\tan(2\theta)$		$= \frac{2\tan\theta}{1-\tan^2\theta}$
$\cot(2\theta)$	$= \frac{\cot^2\theta - 1}{2\cot\theta}$	$= \frac{1 - \tan^2\theta}{2\tan\theta}$
$\sec(2\theta)$	$= \frac{\sec^2\theta}{2 - \sec^2\theta}$	$= \frac{1 + \tan^2\theta}{1 - \tan^2\theta}$
$\csc(2\theta)$	$= \frac{\sec\theta \csc\theta}{2}$	$= \frac{1 + \tan^2\theta}{2\tan\theta}$

==== Triple-angle formulae ====
Formulae for triple angles.

$$\begin{align}
\sin (3\theta) &=3\sin\theta - 4\sin^3\theta &&= 4\sin\theta\sin\left(\tfrac{\pi}{3} -\theta\right)\sin\left(\tfrac{\pi}{3} + \theta\right)\\
\cos (3\theta) &= 4 \cos^3\theta - 3 \cos\theta &&=4\cos\theta\cos\left(\tfrac{\pi}{3} -\theta\right)\cos\left(\tfrac{\pi}{3} + \theta\right)\\
\tan (3\theta) &= \frac{3 \tan\theta - \tan^3\theta}{1 - 3 \tan^2\theta} &&= \tan \theta\tan\left(\tfrac{\pi}{3} - \theta\right)\tan\left(\tfrac{\pi}{3} + \theta\right)\\
\cot (3\theta) &= \frac{3 \cot\theta - \cot^3\theta}{1 - 3 \cot^2\theta}\\
\sec (3\theta) &= \frac{\sec^3\theta}{4-3\sec^2\theta}\\
\csc (3\theta) &= \frac{\csc^3\theta}{3\csc^2\theta-4}\\
\end{align}$$

==== Multiple-angle formulae ====
Formulae for multiple angles.

$$\begin{align}
\sin(n\theta) &= \sum_{k \in \mathbb{O}^{+}}^n (-1)^\frac{k-1}{2} {n \choose k}\cos^{n-k} \theta \sin^k \theta =
\sin\theta\sum_{i=0}^\frac{n+1}{2}\sum_{j=0}^{i} (-1)^{i-j} {n \choose 2i + 1}{i \choose j}
\cos^{n-2(i-j)-1} \theta \\
&=\sin(\theta)\sum_{k=0}^{\left\lfloor\frac{n-1}{2}\right\rfloor}(-1)^k \bigl(2 \cos(\theta)\bigr)^{n-2k-1} {n-k-1 \choose k} \\
&=2^{(n-1)} \prod_{k=0}^{n-1} \sin\left(\frac{k\pi}{n}+\theta\right)\\
\cos(n\theta) &= \sum_{k \in \mathbb{E}_0^{+}}^n (-1)^\frac{k}{2} {n \choose k}\cos^{n-k} \theta \sin^k \theta =
\sum_{i=0}^\frac{n}{2}\sum_{j=0}^{i} (-1)^{i-j} {n \choose 2i}{i \choose j} \cos^{n-2(i-j)} \theta \\
&= \sum_{k=0}^{\left\lfloor\frac{n}{2}\right\rfloor} (-1)^k {(2 \cos(\theta))}^{n-2k} {n-k \choose k}\frac{n}{2n-2k}\\
\cos\bigl((2n+1)\theta\bigr)&=(-1)^n 2^{2n}\prod_{k=0}^{2n}\cos\left(\frac{k\pi}{2n+1}-\theta\right)\\
\cos(2 n \theta)&=(-1)^n 2^{2n-1} \prod_{k=0}^{2n-1} \cos\left(\frac{(1+2k)\pi}{4n}-\theta\right)\\
\tan(n\theta) &= \frac{\displaystyle\sum_{k \in \mathbb{O}^{+}}^n (-1)^\frac{k-1}{2} {n \choose k}\tan^k \theta}{\displaystyle\sum_{k\in \mathbb{E}_0^{+}}^n (-1)^\frac{k}{2} {n \choose k}\tan^k \theta}\\
\mathbb{O}^{+} &= \text{Positive odd integers}\\
\mathbb{E}_0^{+} &= \text{Non-negative even integers}\\
\end{align}$$

==== Chebyshev method ====
The Chebyshev method is a recursive algorithm for finding the nth multiple angle formula knowing the $(n-1)$th and $(n-2)$th values.

$\cos(nx)$ can be computed from $\cos((n-1)x)$, $\cos((n-2)x)$, and $\cos(x)$ with

$$\cos(nx)=2 \cos x \cos\bigl((n-1)x\bigr) - \cos\bigl((n-2)x\bigr).$$

This can be proved by adding together the formulae

$$\begin{align}
\cos \bigl((n-1)x + x\bigr) &= \cos \bigl((n-1)x\bigr) \cos x-\sin \bigl((n-1)x\bigr) \sin x \\
\cos \bigl((n-1)x - x\bigr) &= \cos \bigl((n-1)x\bigr) \cos x+\sin \bigl((n-1)x\bigr) \sin x
\end{align}$$

It follows by induction that $\cos(nx)$ is a polynomial of $\cos x$, the so-called Chebyshev polynomial of the first kind, T_n; thus,
$$\cos (n\theta) = T_n (\cos \theta )$$

Similarly, $\sin(nx)$ can be computed from $\sin((n-1)x)$, $\sin((n-2)x)$, and $\cos x$ with
$$\sin(nx)=2 \cos x \sin\bigl((n-1)x\bigr)-\sin\bigl((n-2)x\bigr)$$

This can be proved by adding formulae for $\sin((n-1)x+x)$ and $\sin((n-1)x-x).$

Serving a purpose similar to that of the Chebyshev method, for the tangent we can write:

$$\tan (nx) = \frac{\tan \bigl((n-1)x\bigr) + \tan x}{1- \tan \bigl((n-1)x\bigr) \tan x}\,.$$

=== Half-angle formulas ===
$$\begin{align}
\sin \frac{\theta}{2} &= \sgn\left(\sin\frac\theta2\right) \sqrt{\frac{1 - \cos \theta}{2}} \\[3pt]
\cos \frac{\theta}{2} &= \sgn\left(\cos\frac\theta2\right) \sqrt{\frac{1 + \cos\theta}{2}} \\[3pt]
\tan \frac{\theta}{2}
&= \frac{1 - \cos \theta}{\sin \theta}
= \frac{\sin \theta}{1 + \cos \theta}
= \csc \theta - \cot \theta
= \frac{\tan\theta}{1 + \sec{\theta}} \\[6mu]
&= \sgn(\sin \theta) \sqrt\frac{1 - \cos \theta}{1 + \cos \theta}
= \frac{-1 + \sgn(\cos \theta) \sqrt{1+\tan^2\theta}}{\tan\theta} \\[3pt]
\cot \frac{\theta}{2}
&= \frac{1 + \cos \theta}{\sin \theta}
= \frac{\sin \theta}{1 - \cos \theta}
= \csc \theta + \cot \theta
= \sgn(\sin \theta) \sqrt\frac{1 + \cos \theta}{1 - \cos \theta} \\
\sec \frac{\theta}{2}
&= \sgn\left(\cos\frac\theta2\right) \sqrt{\frac{2}{1 + \cos\theta}} \\
\csc \frac{\theta}{2}
&= \sgn\left(\sin\frac\theta2\right) \sqrt{\frac{2}{1 - \cos\theta}} \\
\end{align}$$

Also
$$\begin{align}
\tan\frac{\eta\pm\theta}{2} &= \frac{\sin\eta \pm \sin\theta}{\cos\eta + \cos\theta} \\[3pt]
\tan\left(\frac{\theta}{2} + \frac{\pi}{4}\right) &= \sec\theta + \tan\theta \\[3pt]
\sqrt{\frac{1 - \sin\theta}{1 + \sin\theta}} &= \frac{\left|1 - \tan\frac{\theta}{2}\right|}{\left|1 + \tan\frac{\theta}{2}\right|}
\end{align}$$

=== Table ===
These can be shown by using either the sum and difference identities or the multiple-angle formulae.

	Sine	Cosine	Tangent	Cotangent
Double-angle formula	$$\begin{align} \sin (2\theta) &= 2 \sin \theta \cos \theta \ \\ &= \frac{2 \tan \theta} {1 + \tan^2 \theta} \end{align}$$	$$\begin{align} \cos (2\theta) &= \cos^2 \theta - \sin^2 \theta \\ &= 2 \cos^2 \theta - 1 \\ &= 1 - 2 \sin^2 \theta \\ &= \frac{1 - \tan^2 \theta} {1 + \tan^2 \theta} \end{align}$$	$\tan (2\theta) = \frac{2 \tan \theta} {1 - \tan^2 \theta}$	$\cot (2\theta) = \frac{\cot^2 \theta - 1}{2 \cot \theta}$
Triple-angle formula	$$\begin{align} \sin (3\theta) &= - \sin^3\theta + 3 \cos^2\theta \sin\theta\\ &= - 4\sin^3\theta + 3\sin\theta \end{align}$$	$$\begin{align} \cos (3\theta) &= \cos^3\theta - 3 \sin^2 \theta\cos \theta \\ &= 4 \cos^3\theta - 3 \cos\theta \end{align}$$	$\tan (3\theta) = \frac{3 \tan\theta - \tan^3\theta}{1 - 3 \tan^2\theta}$	$\cot (3\theta) = \frac{3 \cot\theta - \cot^3\theta}{1 - 3 \cot^2\theta}$
Half-angle formula	$$\begin{align} &\sin \frac{\theta}{2} = \sgn\left(\sin\frac\theta2\right) \sqrt{\frac{1 - \cos \theta}{2}} \\ \\ &\left(\text{or }\sin^2\frac{\theta}{2} = \frac{1 - \cos\theta}{2}\right) \end{align}$$	$$\begin{align} &\cos \frac{\theta}{2} = \sgn\left(\cos\frac\theta2\right) \sqrt{\frac{1 + \cos\theta}{2}} \\ \\ &\left(\text{or } \cos^2\frac{\theta}{2} = \frac{1 + \cos\theta}{2}\right) \end{align}$$	$$\begin{align} \tan \frac{\theta}{2} &= \csc \theta - \cot \theta \\ &= \pm\, \sqrt\frac{1 - \cos \theta}{1 + \cos \theta} \\[3pt] &= \frac{\sin \theta}{1 + \cos \theta} \\[3pt] &= \frac{1 - \cos \theta}{\sin \theta} \\[5pt] \tan\frac{\eta + \theta}{2} &= \frac{\sin\eta + \sin\theta}{\cos\eta + \cos\theta} \\[5pt] \tan\left(\frac{\theta}{2} + \frac{\pi}{4}\right) &= \sec\theta + \tan\theta \\[5pt] \sqrt{\frac{1 - \sin\theta}{1 + \sin\theta}} &= \frac{\left|1 - \tan\frac{\theta}{2}\right|}{\left|1 + \tan\frac{\theta}{2}\right|} \\[5pt] \tan\frac{\theta}{2} &= \frac{\tan\theta}{1 + \sqrt{1 + \tan^2\theta}} \\ &\text{for } \theta \in \left(-\tfrac{\pi}{2},\tfrac{\pi}{2} \right) \end{align}$$	$$\begin{align} \cot \frac{\theta}{2} &= \csc \theta + \cot \theta \\ &= \pm\, \sqrt\frac{1 + \cos \theta}{1 - \cos \theta} \\[3pt] &= \frac{\sin \theta}{1 - \cos \theta} \\[4pt] &= \frac{1 + \cos \theta}{\sin \theta} \end{align}$$

The fact that the triple-angle formula for sine and cosine only involves powers of a single function allows one to relate the geometric problem of a compass and straightedge construction of angle trisection to the algebraic problem of solving a cubic equation, which allows one to prove that trisection is in general impossible using the given tools.

A formula for computing the trigonometric identities for the one-third angle exists, but it requires finding the zeroes of the cubic equation 4x^{3} − 3x + d = 0, where x is the value of the cosine function at the one-third angle and d is the known value of the cosine function at the full angle. However, the discriminant of this equation is positive, so this equation has three real roots (of which only one is the solution for the cosine of the one-third angle). None of these solutions are reducible to a real algebraic expression, as they use intermediate complex numbers under the cube roots.

== Power-reduction formula ==
Obtained by solving the second and third versions of the cosine double-angle formula.

Sine	Cosine	Other
$\sin^2\theta = \frac{1 - \cos (2\theta)}{2}$	$\cos^2\theta = \frac{1 + \cos (2\theta)}{2}$	$\sin^2\theta \cos^2\theta = \frac{1 - \cos (4\theta)}{8}$
$\sin^3\theta = \frac{3 \sin\theta - \sin (3\theta)}{4}$	$\cos^3\theta = \frac{3 \cos\theta + \cos (3\theta)}{4}$	$\sin^3\theta \cos^3\theta = \frac{3\sin (2\theta) - \sin (6\theta)}{32}$
$\sin^4\theta = \frac{3 - 4 \cos (2\theta) + \cos (4\theta)}{8}$	$\cos^4\theta = \frac{3 + 4 \cos (2\theta) + \cos (4\theta)}{8}$	$\sin^4\theta \cos^4\theta = \frac{3-4\cos (4\theta) + \cos (8\theta)}{128}$
$\sin^5\theta = \frac{10 \sin\theta - 5 \sin (3\theta) + \sin (5\theta)}{16}$	$\cos^5\theta = \frac{10 \cos\theta + 5 \cos (3\theta) + \cos (5\theta)}{16}$	$\sin^5\theta \cos^5\theta = \frac{10\sin (2\theta) - 5\sin (6\theta) + \sin (10\theta)}{512}$

Cosine power-reduction formula: an illustrative diagram. The red, orange and blue triangles are all similar, and the red and orange triangles are congruent. The hypotenuse $\overline{AD}$ of the blue triangle has length $2 \cos \theta$. The angle $\angle DAE$ is $\theta$, so the base $\overline{AE}$ of that triangle has length $2 \cos^2 \theta$. That length is also equal to the summed lengths of $\overline{BD}$ and $\overline{AF}$, i.e. $1 + \cos (2\theta)$. Therefore, $2 \cos^2\theta = 1 + \cos (2\theta)$. Dividing both sides by $2$ yields the power-reduction formula for cosine: $\cos^2\theta =$ $\frac{1}{2}(1 + \cos (2\theta))$. The half-angle formula for cosine can be obtained by replacing $\theta$ with $\theta/2$ and taking the square-root of both sides: $\cos \left(\theta / 2\right) = \pm \sqrt{\left(1 + \cos \theta\right) /2}.$

Sine power-reduction formula: an illustrative diagram. The shaded blue and green triangles, and the red-outlined triangle $EBD$ are all right-angled and similar, and all contain the angle $\theta$. The hypotenuse $\overline{BD}$ of the red-outlined triangle has length $2 \sin \theta$, so its side $\overline{DE}$ has length $2 \sin^2 \theta$. The line segment $\overline{AE}$ has length $\cos 2 \theta$ and sum of the lengths of $\overline{AE}$ and $\overline{DE}$ equals the length of $\overline{AD}$, which is 1. Therefore, $\cos 2 \theta + 2 \sin^2 \theta = 1$. Subtracting $\cos 2 \theta$ from both sides and dividing by 2 by two yields the power-reduction formula for sine: $\sin^2 \theta =$ $\frac{1}{2} (1 - \cos (2\theta))$. The half-angle formula for sine can be obtained by replacing $\theta$ with $\theta/2$ and taking the square-root of both sides: $\sin \left(\theta/2\right) = \pm \sqrt{\left(1 - \cos \theta\right)/2}.$ Note that this figure also illustrates, in the vertical line segment $\overline{EB}$, that $\sin 2 \theta = 2 \sin \theta \cos \theta$.

In general terms of powers of $\sin \theta$ or $\cos \theta$ the following is true, and can be deduced using De Moivre's formula, Euler's formula and the binomial theorem.

if n is ...	$\cos^n \theta$	$\sin^n \theta$
n is odd	$\cos^n\theta = \frac{2}{2^n} \sum_{k=0}^{\frac{n-1}{2}} \binom{n}{k} \cos{\big((n-2k)\theta\big)}$	$\sin^n\theta = \frac{2}{2^n} \sum_{k=0}^{\frac{n-1}{2}} (-1)^{\left(\frac{n-1}{2}-k\right)} \binom{n}{k} \sin{\big((n-2k)\theta\big)}$
n is even	$\cos^n\theta = \frac{1}{2^n} \binom{n}{\frac{n}{2}} + \frac{2}{2^n} \sum_{k=0}^{\frac{n}{2}-1} \binom{n}{k} \cos{\big((n-2k)\theta\big)}$	$\sin^n\theta = \frac{1}{2^n} \binom{n}{\frac{n}{2}} + \frac{2}{2^n} \sum_{k=0}^{\frac{n}{2}-1} (-1)^{\left(\frac{n}{2}-k\right)} \binom{n}{k} \cos{\big((n-2k)\theta\big)}$

== Product-to-sum and sum-to-product identities ==
Proof of the sum-and-difference-to-product cosine identity for prosthaphaeresis calculations using an isosceles triangle

The product-to-sum identities or prosthaphaeresis formulae can be proven by expanding their right-hand sides using the angle addition theorems. Historically, the first four of these were known as Werner's formulas, after Johannes Werner who used them for astronomical calculations. See amplitude modulation for an application of the product-to-sum formulae, and beat (acoustics) and phase detector for applications of the sum-to-product formulae.

=== Product-to-sum identities ===
The product of two sines or cosines of different angles can be converted to a sum of trigonometric functions of a sum and difference of those angles:

$$\begin{align}
\cos \theta\, \cos \varphi &= \tfrac12\bigl(\!\!~\cos(\theta - \varphi) + \cos(\theta + \varphi)\bigr), \\[5mu]
\sin \theta\, \sin \varphi &= \tfrac12\bigl(\!\!~\cos(\theta - \varphi) - \cos(\theta + \varphi)\bigr), \\[5mu]
\sin \theta\, \cos \varphi &= \tfrac12\bigl(\!\!~\sin(\theta + \varphi) + \sin(\theta - \varphi)\bigr), \\[5mu]
\cos \theta\, \sin \varphi &= \tfrac12\bigl(\!\!~\sin(\theta + \varphi) - \sin(\theta - \varphi)\bigr).
\end{align}$$
As a corollary, the product or quotient of tangents can be converted to a quotient of sums of cosines or sines, respectively,
$$\begin{align}
\tan \theta\, \tan \varphi &= \frac{\cos(\theta-\varphi)-\cos(\theta+\varphi)}
{\cos(\theta-\varphi)+\cos(\theta+\varphi)}, \\[5mu]
\frac{\tan \theta}{\tan \varphi} &= \frac{\sin(\theta + \varphi) + \sin(\theta - \varphi)}
{\sin(\theta + \varphi) - \sin(\theta - \varphi)}.
\end{align}$$

More generally, for a product of any number of sines or cosines,
$$\begin{align}
\prod_{k=1}^n \cos \theta_k
&= \frac{1}{2^n}\sum_{e\in S} \cos(e_1\theta_1+\cdots+e_n\theta_n) \\[5mu]
& \text{where }e = (e_1,\ldots,e_n) \in S=\{1,-1\}^n, \\
\prod_{k=1}^n \sin\theta_k
&=\frac{(-1)^{\left\lfloor\frac
{n}{2}\right\rfloor}}{2^n}\begin{cases}
\displaystyle\sum_{e\in S}\cos(e_1\theta_1+\cdots+e_n\theta_n)\prod_{j=1}^n e_j \;\text{if}\; n\; \text{is even},\\
\displaystyle\sum_{e\in S}\sin(e_1\theta_1+\cdots+e_n\theta_n)\prod_{j=1}^n e_j \;\text{if}\; n\; \text{is odd}.
\end{cases}
\end{align}$$

=== Sum-to-product identities ===
Diagram illustrating sum-to-product identities for sine and cosine. The blue right-angled triangle has angle $\theta$ and the red right-angled triangle has angle $\varphi$. Both have a hypotenuse of length 1. Auxiliary angles, here called $p$ and $q$, are constructed such that $p=\tfrac12(\theta+\varphi)$ and $q=\tfrac12(\theta-\varphi)$. Therefore, $\theta = p+q$ and $\varphi = p-q$. This allows the two congruent purple-outline triangles $AFG$ and $FCE$ to be constructed, each with hypotenuse $\cos q$ and angle $p$ at their base. The sum of the heights of the red and blue triangles is $\sin \theta + \sin \varphi$, and this is equal to twice the height of one purple triangle, i.e. $2 \sin p \cos q$. Writing $p$ and $q$ in that equation in terms of $\theta$ and $\varphi$ yields a sum-to-product identity for sine: $\sin \theta + \sin \varphi = 2 \sin \tfrac12 (\theta + \varphi)\, \cos\tfrac12(\theta - \varphi)$. Similarly, the sum of the widths of the red and blue triangles yields the corresponding identity for cosine.

The sum of sines or cosines of two angles can be converted to a product of sines or cosines of the mean and half the difference of the angles:

$$\begin{align}
\sin \theta + \sin \varphi
&= 2 \sin \tfrac{\theta + \varphi}2\, \cos \tfrac{\theta - \varphi}2, \\[5mu]
\sin \theta - \sin \varphi
&= 2 \cos \tfrac{\theta + \varphi}2\, \sin \tfrac{\theta - \varphi}2, \\[5mu]
\cos \theta + \cos \varphi
&= 2 \cos \tfrac{\theta + \varphi}2\, \cos\tfrac{\theta - \varphi}2, \\[5mu]
\cos \theta - \cos \varphi
&= -2\sin \tfrac{\theta + \varphi}2\, \sin\tfrac{\theta - \varphi}2.
\end{align}$$

The sum of the tangent of two angles can be converted to a quotient of the sine of angles divided by the product of the cosines:
$$\tan\theta\pm\tan\varphi
=\frac{\sin(\theta\pm \varphi)}{\cos\theta\,\cos\varphi}.$$

=== Hermite's cotangent identity ===
Charles Hermite demonstrated the following identity. Suppose $a_1, \ldots, a_n$ are complex numbers, no two of which differ by an integer multiple of π. Let

$$A_{n,k} = \prod_{\begin{smallmatrix} 1 \le j \le n \\ j \neq k \end{smallmatrix}} \cot(a_k - a_j)$$

(in particular, $A_{1,1},$ being an empty product, is 1). Then

$$\cot(z - a_1)\cdots\cot(z - a_n) = \cos\frac{n\pi}{2} + \sum_{k=1}^n A_{n,k} \cot(z - a_k).$$

The simplest non-trivial example is the case n = 2:

$$\cot(z - a_1)\cot(z - a_2) = -1 + \cot(a_1 - a_2)\cot(z - a_1) + \cot(a_2 - a_1)\cot(z - a_2).$$

=== Finite products of trigonometric functions ===
For coprime integers n, m

$$\prod_{k=1}^n \left(2a + 2\cos\left(\frac{2 \pi k m}{n} + x\right)\right) = 2\left( T_n(a)+{(-1)}^{n+m}\cos(n x) \right)$$

where T_{n} is the Chebyshev polynomial.

The following relationship holds for the sine function

$$\prod_{k=1}^{n-1} \sin\left(\frac{k\pi}{n}\right) = \frac{n}{2^{n-1}}.$$

More generally for an integer n > 0

$$\sin(nx) = 2^{n-1}\prod_{k=0}^{n-1} \sin\left(\frac{k\pi}{n} + x\right) = 2^{n-1}\prod_{k=1}^{n} \sin\left(\frac{k\pi}{n} - x\right).$$

or written in terms of the chord function $\operatorname{crd}x \equiv 2\sin\tfrac12x$,

$$\operatorname{crd}(nx) = \prod_{k=1}^{n} \operatorname{crd}\left(\frac{2k\pi}{n} - x\right).$$

This comes from the factorization of the polynomial $z^n - 1$ into linear factors (cf. root of unity): For any complex z and an integer n > 0,

$$z^n - 1 = \prod_{k=1}^{n}\left( z - \exp \frac{2ki\pi}{n}\right).$$

== Linear combinations ==
For some purposes it is important to know that any linear combination of sine waves of the same period or frequency but different phase shifts is also a sine wave with the same period or frequency, but a different phase shift. This is useful in sinusoid data fitting, because the measured or observed data are linearly related to the a and b unknowns of the in-phase and quadrature components basis below, resulting in a simpler Jacobian, compared to that of $c$ and $\varphi$.

=== Sine and cosine ===
The linear combination, or harmonic addition, of sine and cosine waves is equivalent to a single sine wave with a phase shift and scaled amplitude,

$$a\cos x+b\sin x=c\cos(x+\varphi)$$

where $c$ and $\varphi$ are defined as so:

$$\begin{align}
c &= \sgn(a) \sqrt{a^2 + b^2}, \\
\varphi &= \arctan\left(-\frac{b}{a}\right),
\end{align}$$

given that $a \neq 0.$

=== Arbitrary phase shift ===
More generally, for arbitrary phase shifts, we have

$$a \sin(x + \theta_a) + b \sin(x + \theta_b)= c \sin(x+\varphi)$$

where $c$ and $\varphi$ satisfy:

$$\begin{align}
c^2 &= a^2 + b^2 + 2ab\cos \left(\theta_a - \theta_b \right) , \\
\tan \varphi &= \frac{a \sin \theta_a + b \sin \theta_b}{a \cos \theta_a + b \cos \theta_b}.
\end{align}$$

=== More than two sinusoids ===
The general case reads

$$\sum_i a_i \sin(x + \theta_i) = a \sin(x + \theta),$$
where
$$a^2 = \sum_{i,j}a_i a_j \cos(\theta_i - \theta_j)$$
and
$$\tan\theta = \frac{\sum_i a_i \sin\theta_i}{\sum_i a_i \cos\theta_i}.$$

== Lagrange's trigonometric identities ==
These identities, named after Joseph Louis Lagrange, are:
$$\begin{align}
\sum_{k=0}^n \sin k\theta & = \frac{\cos \tfrac12\theta - \cos\left(\left(n + \tfrac12\right)\theta\right)}{2\sin\tfrac12\theta}\\[5pt]
\sum_{k=1}^n \cos k\theta & = \frac{-\sin \tfrac12\theta + \sin\left(\left(n + \tfrac12\right)\theta\right)}{2\sin\tfrac12\theta}
\end{align}$$
for $\theta \not\equiv 0 \pmod{2\pi}.$

A related function is the Dirichlet kernel:

$$D_n(\theta) = 1 + 2\sum_{k=1}^n \cos k\theta
= \frac{\sin\left(\left(n + \tfrac12 \right)\theta\right)}{\sin \tfrac12 \theta}.$$

A similar identity is

$$\sum_{k=1}^n \cos (2k -1)\alpha = \frac{\sin (2n \alpha)}{2 \sin \alpha}.$$

The proof is the following. By using the angle sum and difference identities,
$$\sin (A + B) - \sin (A - B) = 2 \cos A \sin B.$$
Then let's examine the following formula,

$$2 \sin \alpha \sum_{k=1}^n \cos (2k - 1)\alpha = 2\sin \alpha \cos \alpha + 2 \sin \alpha \cos 3\alpha
+ 2 \sin \alpha \cos 5 \alpha + \cdots + 2 \sin \alpha \cos (2n - 1) \alpha$$
and this formula can be written by using the above identity,

$$\begin{align}
& 2 \sin \alpha \sum_{k=1}^n \cos (2k - 1)\alpha \\
&\quad= \sum_{k=1}^n (\sin (2k \alpha) - \sin (2(k - 1)\alpha)) \\
&\quad= (\sin 2\alpha - \sin 0) + (\sin 4 \alpha - \sin 2 \alpha) + (\sin 6 \alpha - \sin 4 \alpha) + \cdots
+ (\sin (2n \alpha) - \sin (2(n - 1) \alpha)) \\
&\quad= \sin (2n \alpha).
\end{align}$$

So, dividing this formula with $2 \sin \alpha$ completes the proof.

== Certain linear fractional transformations ==
If $f(x)$ is given by the linear fractional transformation
$$f(x) = \frac{(\cos\alpha)x - \sin\alpha}{(\sin\alpha)x + \cos\alpha},$$
and similarly
$$g(x) = \frac{(\cos\beta)x - \sin\beta}{(\sin\beta)x + \cos\beta},$$
then
$$f\big(g(x)\big) = g\big(f(x)\big)
= \frac{\big(\cos(\alpha+\beta)\big)x - \sin(\alpha+\beta)}{\big(\sin(\alpha+\beta)\big)x + \cos(\alpha+\beta)}.$$

More tersely stated, if for all $\alpha$ we let $f_{\alpha}$ be what we called $f$ above, then
$$f_\alpha \circ f_\beta = f_{\alpha+\beta}.$$

If $x$ is the slope of a line, then $f(x)$ is the slope of its rotation through an angle of $- \alpha.$

== Relation to the complex exponential function ==
Euler's formula states that, for any real number x:
$$e^{ix} = \cos x + i\sin x,$$
where i is the imaginary unit. Substituting −x for x gives us:
$$e^{-ix} = \cos(-x) + i\sin(-x) = \cos x - i\sin x.$$

These two equations can be used to solve for cosine and sine in terms of the exponential function. Specifically,
$$\cos x = \frac{e^{ix} + e^{-ix}}{2}$$
$$\sin x = \frac{e^{ix} - e^{-ix}}{2i}$$

These formulae are useful for proving many other trigonometric identities. For example, that e^{i(θ+φ)} = e^{iθ} e^{iφ} means that

cos(θ + φ) + i sin(θ + φ) = (cos θ + i sin θ) (cos φ + i sin φ) = (cos θ cos φ − sin θ sin φ) + i (cos θ sin φ + sin θ cos φ).

That the real part of the left hand side equals the real part of the right hand side is an angle addition formula for cosine. The equality of the imaginary parts gives an angle addition formula for sine.

The following table expresses the trigonometric functions and their inverses in terms of the exponential function and the complex logarithm.

Function	Inverse function
$\sin \theta = \frac{e^{i\theta} - e^{-i\theta}}{2i}$	$\arcsin x = -i\, \ln \left(ix + \sqrt{1 - x^2}\right)$
$\cos \theta = \frac{e^{i\theta} + e^{-i\theta}}{2}$	$\arccos x = -i\ln\left(x+\sqrt{x^2-1}\right)$
$\tan \theta = -i\, \frac{e^{i\theta} - e^{-i\theta}}{e^{i\theta} + e^{-i\theta}}$	$\arctan x = \frac{i}{2} \ln \left(\frac{i + x}{i - x}\right)$
$\csc \theta = \frac{2i}{e^{i\theta} - e^{-i\theta}}$	$\arccsc x = -i\, \ln \left(\frac{i}{x} + \sqrt{1 - \frac{1}{x^2}}\right)$
$\sec \theta = \frac{2}{e^{i\theta} + e^{-i\theta}}$	$\arcsec x = -i\, \ln \left(\frac{1}{x} +i \sqrt{1 - \frac{1}{x^2}}\right)$
$\cot \theta = i\, \frac{e^{i\theta} + e^{-i\theta}}{e^{i\theta} - e^{-i\theta}}$	$\arccot x = \frac{i}{2} \ln \left(\frac{x - i}{x + i}\right)$
$\operatorname{cis} \theta = e^{i\theta}$	$\operatorname{arccis} x = -i \ln x$

== Relation to complex hyperbolic functions ==
Trigonometric functions may be deduced from hyperbolic functions with complex arguments. The formulae for the relations are shown below.
$$\begin{align}
\sin x &= -i \sinh (ix)  \\
\cos x &= \cosh (ix) \\
\tan x &= -i \tanh (i x) \\
\cot x &= i \coth (i x) \\
\sec x &= \operatorname{sech} (i x) \\
\csc x &= i \operatorname{csch} (i x) \\
\end{align}$$

== Series expansion ==
When using a power series expansion to define trigonometric functions, the following identities are obtained:

$$\begin{align}
\sin x &= x - \frac{x^3}{3!} + \frac{x^5}{5!} - \frac{x^7}{7!} + \cdots &&= \sum_{n=0}^\infty (-1)^n \frac{x^{2n+1}}{(2n+1)!} \\
\cos x & = 1 - \frac{x^2}{2!} + \frac{x^4}{4!} - \frac{x^6}{6!} + \cdots &&= \sum_{n=0}^\infty (-1)^n \frac{x^{2n}}{(2n)!}
\end{align}$$

== Infinite product formulae ==
For applications to special functions, the following infinite product formulae for trigonometric functions are useful:

$$\begin{align}
\sin x &= x \prod_{n = 1}^\infty\left(1 - \frac{x^2}{\pi^2 n^2}\right), &
\cos x &=   \prod_{n = 1}^\infty\left(1 - \frac{x^2}{\pi^2\left(n - \frac{1}{2}\right)\!\vphantom)^2}\right), \\[10mu]
\sinh x &= x \prod_{n = 1}^\infty\left(1 + \frac{x^2}{\pi^2 n^2}\right), &
\cosh x &=   \prod_{n = 1}^\infty\left(1 + \frac{x^2}{\pi^2\left(n - \frac{1}{2}\right)\!\vphantom)^2}\right).
\end{align}$$

== Inverse trigonometric functions ==
The following identities give the result of composing a trigonometric function with an inverse trigonometric function.

$$\begin{align}
\sin(\arcsin x) &=x
& \cos(\arcsin x) &=\sqrt{1-x^2}
& \tan(\arcsin x) &=\frac{x}{\sqrt{1 - x^2}}
\\
\sin(\arccos x) &=\sqrt{1-x^2}
& \cos(\arccos x) &=x
& \tan(\arccos x) &=\frac{\sqrt{1 - x^2}}{x}
\\
\sin(\arctan x) &=\frac{x}{\sqrt{1+x^2}}
& \cos(\arctan x) &=\frac{1}{\sqrt{1+x^2}}
& \tan(\arctan x) &=x
\\
\sin(\arccsc x) &=\frac{1}{x}
& \cos(\arccsc x) &=\sqrt{1-\frac{1}{x^2}}
& \tan(\arccsc x) &=\frac{1}{x\sqrt{1-\frac{1}{x^2}}}
\\
\sin(\arcsec x) &=\sqrt{1-\frac{1}{x^2}}
& \cos(\arcsec x) &=\frac{1}{x}
& \tan(\arcsec x) &=x\sqrt{1-\frac{1}{x^2}}
\\
\sin(\arccot x) &=\frac{1}{\sqrt{1+x^2}}
& \cos(\arccot x) &=\frac{x}{\sqrt{1+x^2}}
& \tan(\arccot x) &=\frac{1}{x}
\\
\end{align}$$

Taking the multiplicative inverse of both sides of the each equation above results in the equations for $\csc = \frac{1}{\sin}, \;\sec = \frac{1}{\cos}, \text{ and } \cot = \frac{1}{\tan}.$ The right hand side of the formula above will always be flipped. For example, the equation for $\cot(\arcsin x)$ is:
$$\cot(\arcsin x) = \frac{1}{\tan(\arcsin x)} = \frac{1}{\frac{x}{\sqrt{1 - x^2}}} = \frac{\sqrt{1 - x^2}}{x}$$
while the equations for $\csc(\arccos x)$ and $\sec(\arccos x)$ are:
$$\csc(\arccos x) = \frac{1}{\sin(\arccos x)} = \frac{1}{\sqrt{1-x^2}} \qquad \text{ and }\quad \sec(\arccos x) = \frac{1}{\cos(\arccos x)} = \frac{1}{x}.$$

The following identities are implied by the reflection identities. They hold whenever $x, r, s, -x, -r,$ and $-s$ are in the domains of the relevant functions.
$$\begin{alignat}{9}
\frac{\pi}{2} ~&=~ \arcsin(x) &&+ \arccos(x) ~&&=~ \arctan(r) &&+ \arccot(r) ~&&=~ \arcsec(s) &&+ \arccsc(s) \\[0.4ex]
\pi ~&=~ \arccos(x) &&+ \arccos(-x) ~&&=~ \arccot(r) &&+ \arccot(-r) ~&&=~ \arcsec(s) &&+ \arcsec(-s) \\[0.4ex]
0 ~&=~ \arcsin(x) &&+ \arcsin(-x) ~&&=~ \arctan(r) &&+ \arctan(-r) ~&&=~ \arccsc(s) &&+ \arccsc(-s) \\[1.0ex]
\end{alignat}$$

Also,
$$\begin{align}
\arctan x + \arctan \dfrac{1}{x}
&= \begin{cases}
\frac{\pi}{2},  & \text{if } x > 0 \\
- \frac{\pi}{2},  & \text{if } x < 0
\end{cases} \\
\arccot x + \arccot \dfrac{1}{x}
&= \begin{cases}
\frac{\pi}{2},  & \text{if } x > 0 \\
\frac{3\pi}{2}, & \text{if } x < 0
\end{cases} \\
\end{align}$$
$$\arccos \frac{1}{x} = \arcsec x \qquad \text{ and } \qquad \arcsec \frac{1}{x} = \arccos x$$
$$\arcsin \frac{1}{x} = \arccsc x \qquad \text{ and } \qquad \arccsc \frac{1}{x} = \arcsin x$$

The arctangent function can be expanded as a series:
$$\arctan(nx) = \sum_{m = 1}^n \arctan\frac{x}{1 + (m - 1)mx^2}$$

== Identities without variables ==
In terms of the arctangent function we have
$$\arctan \frac{1}{2} = \arctan \frac{1}{3} + \arctan \frac{1}{7}$$

which is a special case of Euler's arctangent identity:

$$\arctan \frac{1}{p} = \arctan \frac{1}{p+q} + \arctan \frac{q}{p^2+pq+1}.$$

The curious identity known as Morrie's law,
$$\cos 20^\circ\cdot\cos 40^\circ\cdot\cos 80^\circ = \frac{1}{8},$$

is a special case of an identity that contains one variable:
$$\prod_{j=0}^{k-1}\cos\left(2^j x\right) = \frac{\sin\left(2^k x\right)}{2^k\sin x}.$$

Similarly,
$$\sin 20^\circ\cdot\sin 40^\circ\cdot\sin 80^\circ = \frac{\sqrt{3}}{8}$$
is a special case of an identity with $x = 20^\circ$:
$$\sin x \cdot \sin \left(60^\circ - x\right) \cdot \sin \left(60^\circ + x\right) = \frac{\sin 3x}{4}.$$

For the case $x = 15^\circ$,
$$\begin{align}
\sin 15^\circ\cdot\sin 45^\circ\cdot\sin 75^\circ &= \frac{\sqrt{2}}{8}, \\
\sin 15^\circ\cdot\sin 75^\circ &= \frac{1}{4}.
\end{align}$$

For the case $x = 10^\circ$,
$$\sin 10^\circ\cdot\sin 50^\circ\cdot\sin 70^\circ = \frac{1}{8}.$$

The same cosine identity is
$$\cos x \cdot \cos \left(60^\circ - x\right) \cdot \cos \left(60^\circ + x\right) = \frac{\cos 3x}{4}.$$

Similarly,
$$\begin{align}
\cos 10^\circ\cdot\cos 50^\circ\cdot\cos 70^\circ &= \frac{\sqrt{3}}{8}, \\
\cos 15^\circ\cdot\cos 45^\circ\cdot\cos 75^\circ &= \frac{\sqrt{2}}{8}, \\
\cos 15^\circ\cdot\cos 75^\circ &= \frac{1}{4}.
\end{align}$$

Similarly,
$$\begin{align}
\tan 50^\circ\cdot\tan 60^\circ\cdot\tan 70^\circ &= \tan 80^\circ, \\
\tan 40^\circ\cdot\tan 30^\circ\cdot\tan 20^\circ &= \tan 10^\circ.
\end{align}$$

The following is perhaps not as readily generalized to an identity containing variables (but see explanation below):
$$\cos 24^\circ + \cos 48^\circ + \cos 96^\circ + \cos 168^\circ = \frac{1}{2}.$$

Degree measure ceases to be more felicitous than radian measure when we consider this identity with 21 in the denominators:
$$\cos \frac{2\pi}{21} +
\cos\left(2\cdot\frac{2\pi}{21}\right) +
\cos\left(4\cdot\frac{2\pi}{21}\right) +
\cos\left( 5\cdot\frac{2\pi}{21}\right) +
\cos\left( 8\cdot\frac{2\pi}{21}\right) +
\cos\left(10\cdot\frac{2\pi}{21}\right)
= \frac{1}{2}.$$

The factors 1, 2, 4, 5, 8, 10 may start to make the pattern clear: they are those integers less than 21/2 that are relatively prime to (or have no prime factors in common with) 21. The last several examples are corollaries of a basic fact about the irreducible cyclotomic polynomials: the cosines are the real parts of the zeroes of those polynomials; the sum of the zeroes is the Möbius function evaluated at (in the very last case above) 21; only half of the zeroes are present above. The identity preceding this last one arises in the same fashion with 21 replaced by 15.

Other cosine identities include:
$$\begin{align}
2\cos \frac{\pi}{3} &= 1, \\
2\cos \frac{\pi}{5} \times 2\cos \frac{2\pi}{5} &= 1, \\
2\cos \frac{\pi}{7} \times 2\cos \frac{2\pi}{7}\times 2\cos \frac{3\pi}{7} &= 1,
\end{align}$$
and so forth for all odd numbers, and hence
$$\cos \frac{\pi}{3}+\cos \frac{\pi}{5} \times \cos \frac{2\pi}{5} + \cos \frac{\pi}{7} \times \cos \frac{2\pi}{7} \times \cos \frac{3\pi}{7} + \dots = 1.$$

Many of those curious identities stem from more general facts like the following:
$$\prod_{k=1}^{n-1} \sin\frac{k\pi}{n} = \frac{n}{2^{n-1}}$$
and
$$\prod_{k=1}^{n-1} \cos\frac{k\pi}{n} = \frac{\sin\frac{\pi n}{2}}{2^{n-1}}.$$

Combining these gives us
$$\prod_{k=1}^{n-1} \tan\frac{k\pi}{n} = \frac{n}{\sin\frac{\pi n}{2}}$$

If n is an odd number ($n = 2 m + 1$) we can make use of the symmetries to get
$$\prod_{k=1}^{m} \tan\frac{k\pi}{2m+1} = \sqrt{2m+1}$$

The transfer function of the Butterworth low pass filter can be expressed in terms of polynomial and poles. By setting the frequency as the cutoff frequency, the following identity can be proved:
$$\prod_{k=1}^n \sin\frac{\left(2k - 1\right)\pi}{4n} = \prod_{k=1}^{n} \cos\frac{\left(2k-1\right)\pi}{4n} = \frac{\sqrt{2}}{2^n}$$

=== Computing π ===
An efficient way to compute π to a large number of digits is based on the following identity without variables, due to Machin. This is known as a Machin-like formula:
$$\frac{\pi}{4} = 4 \arctan\frac{1}{5} - \arctan\frac{1}{239}$$
or, alternatively, by using an identity of Leonhard Euler:
$$\frac{\pi}{4} = 5 \arctan\frac{1}{7} + 2 \arctan\frac{3}{79}$$
or by using Pythagorean triples:
$$\pi = \arccos\frac{4}{5} + \arccos\frac{5}{13} + \arccos\frac{16}{65} = \arcsin\frac{3}{5} + \arcsin\frac{12}{13} + \arcsin\frac{63}{65}.$$

Others include:
$$\frac{\pi}{4} = \arctan\frac{1}{2} + \arctan\frac{1}{3},$$
$$\pi = \arctan 1 + \arctan 2 + \arctan 3,$$
$$\frac{\pi}{4} = 2\arctan \frac{1}{3} + \arctan \frac{1}{7}.$$

Generally, for numbers t_{1}, ..., t_{n−1} ∈ (−1, 1) for which θ_{n} = Σ^{n−1}_{k=1} arctan t_{k} ∈ (π/4, 3π/4), let t_{n} = tan(π/2 − θ_{n}) = cot θ_{n}. This last expression can be computed directly using the formula for the cotangent of a sum of angles whose tangents are t_{1}, ..., t_{n−1} and its value will be in (−1, 1). In particular, the computed t_{n} will be rational whenever all the t_{1}, ..., t_{n−1} values are rational. With these values,
$$\begin{align}
\frac{\pi}{2} & = \sum_{k=1}^n \arctan(t_k) \\
\pi & = \sum_{k=1}^n \sgn(t_k) \arccos\left(\frac{1 - t_k^2}{1 + t_k^2}\right) \\
\pi & = \sum_{k=1}^n \arcsin\left(\frac{2t_k}{1 + t_k^2}\right) \\
\pi & = \sum_{k=1}^n \arctan\left(\frac{2t_k}{1 - t_k^2}\right)\,,
\end{align}$$

where in all but the first expression, we have used tangent half-angle formulae. The first two formulae work even if one or more of the t_{k} values is not within (−1, 1). Note that if t = p/q is rational, then the (2t, 1 − t^{2}, 1 + t^{2}) values in the above formulae are proportional to the Pythagorean triple (2pq, q^{2} − p^{2}, q^{2} + p^{2}).

For example, for n = 3 terms,
$$\frac{\pi}{2} = \arctan\left(\frac{a}{b}\right) + \arctan\left(\frac{c}{d}\right) + \arctan\left(\frac{bd - ac}{ad + bc}\right)$$
for any a, b, c, d > 0.

=== An identity of Euclid ===
Euclid showed in Book XIII, Proposition 10 of his Elements that the area of the square on the side of a regular pentagon inscribed in a circle is equal to the sum of the areas of the squares on the sides of the regular hexagon and the regular decagon inscribed in the same circle. In the language of modern trigonometry, this says:
$$\sin^2 18^\circ + \sin^2 30^\circ = \sin^2 36^\circ.$$

Ptolemy used this proposition to compute some angles in his table of chords in Book I, chapter 11 of Almagest.

== Composition of trigonometric functions ==
These identities involve a trigonometric function of a trigonometric function:

$$\cos(t \sin x) = J_0(t) + 2 \sum_{k=1}^\infty J_{2k}(t) \cos(2kx)$$
$$\sin(t \sin x) = 2 \sum_{k=0}^\infty J_{2k+1}(t) \sin\big((2k+1)x\big)$$
$$\cos(t \cos x) = J_0(t) + 2 \sum_{k=1}^\infty (-1)^kJ_{2k}(t) \cos(2kx)$$
$$\sin(t \cos x) = 2 \sum_{k=0}^\infty(-1)^k J_{2k+1}(t) \cos\big((2k+1)x\big)$$

where J_{i} are Bessel functions.

== Further "conditional" identities for the case α + β + γ = 180° ==
A conditional trigonometric identity is a trigonometric identity that holds if specified conditions on the arguments to the trigonometric functions are satisfied. The following formulae apply to arbitrary plane triangles and follow from $\alpha + \beta + \gamma = 180^{\circ},$ as long as the functions occurring in the formulae are well-defined (the latter applies only to the formulae in which tangents and cotangents occur).
$$\begin{align}
\tan \alpha + \tan \beta + \tan \gamma &= \tan \alpha \tan \beta \tan \gamma \\
1 &= \cot \beta \cot \gamma + \cot \gamma \cot \alpha + \cot \alpha \cot \beta \\
\cot\left(\frac{\alpha}{2}\right) + \cot\left(\frac{\beta}{2}\right) + \cot\left(\frac{\gamma}{2}\right) &= \cot\left(\frac{\alpha}{2}\right) \cot \left(\frac{\beta}{2}\right) \cot\left(\frac{\gamma}{2}\right) \\
1 &= \tan\left(\frac{\beta}{2}\right)\tan\left(\frac{\gamma}{2}\right) + \tan\left(\frac{\gamma}{2}\right)\tan\left(\frac{\alpha}{2}\right) + \tan\left(\frac{\alpha}{2}\right)\tan\left(\frac{\beta}{2}\right) \\
\sin \alpha + \sin \beta + \sin \gamma &= 4\cos\left(\frac{\alpha}{2}\right)\cos\left(\frac{\beta}{2}\right)\cos\left(\frac{\gamma}{2}\right) \\
-\sin \alpha + \sin \beta + \sin \gamma &= 4\cos\left(\frac{\alpha}{2}\right)\sin\left(\frac{\beta}{2}\right)\sin\left(\frac{\gamma}{2}\right) \\
\cos \alpha + \cos \beta + \cos \gamma &= 4\sin\left(\frac{\alpha}{2}\right)\sin\left(\frac{\beta}{2}\right)\sin \left(\frac{\gamma}{2}\right) + 1 \\
-\cos \alpha + \cos \beta + \cos \gamma &= 4\sin\left(\frac{\alpha}{2}\right)\cos\left(\frac{\beta}{2}\right)\cos \left(\frac{\gamma}{2}\right) - 1 \\
\sin (2\alpha) + \sin (2\beta) + \sin (2\gamma) &=  4\sin \alpha \sin \beta \sin \gamma \\
-\sin (2\alpha) + \sin (2\beta) + \sin (2\gamma) &=  4\sin \alpha \cos \beta \cos \gamma \\
\cos (2\alpha) + \cos (2\beta) + \cos (2\gamma) &= -4\cos \alpha \cos \beta \cos \gamma - 1 \\
-\cos (2\alpha) + \cos (2\beta) + \cos (2\gamma) &= -4\cos \alpha \sin \beta \sin \gamma + 1 \\
\sin^2\alpha + \sin^2\beta + \sin^2\gamma &=  2 \cos \alpha \cos \beta \cos \gamma + 2 \\
-\sin^2\alpha + \sin^2\beta + \sin^2\gamma &=  2 \cos \alpha \sin \beta \sin \gamma \\
\cos^2\alpha + \cos^2\beta + \cos^2\gamma &= -2 \cos \alpha \cos \beta \cos \gamma + 1 \\
-\cos^2\alpha + \cos^2\beta + \cos^2\gamma &= -2 \cos \alpha \sin \beta \sin \gamma + 1 \\
\sin^2 (2\alpha) + \sin^2 (2\beta) + \sin^2 (2\gamma) &= -2\cos (2\alpha) \cos (2\beta) \cos (2\gamma)+2 \\
\cos^2 (2\alpha) + \cos^2 (2\beta) + \cos^2 (2\gamma) &=  2\cos (2\alpha) \,\cos (2\beta) \,\cos (2\gamma) + 1 \\
1 &= \sin^2 \left(\frac{\alpha}{2}\right) + \sin^2 \left(\frac{\beta}{2}\right) + \sin^2 \left(\frac{\gamma}{2}\right) + 2\sin \left(\frac{\alpha}{2}\right) \,\sin \left(\frac{\beta}{2}\right) \,\sin \left(\frac{\gamma}{2}\right)
\end{align}$$

== Historical shorthands ==
The versine, coversine, haversine, and exsecant were used in navigation. For example, the haversine formula was used to calculate the distance between two points on a sphere. They are rarely used today.

== Miscellaneous ==
=== Dirichlet kernel ===
The Dirichlet kernel D_{n}(x) is the function occurring on both sides of the next identity:
$$1 + 2\cos x + 2\cos(2x) + 2\cos(3x) + \cdots + 2\cos(nx) = \frac{\sin\left(\left(n + \frac{1}{2}\right)x\right) }{\sin\left(\frac{1}{2}x\right)}.$$

The convolution of any integrable function of period $2 \pi$ with the Dirichlet kernel coincides with the function's $n$th-degree Fourier approximation. The same holds for any measure or generalized function.

=== Tangent half-angle substitution ===
If we set
$$t = \tan\frac x 2,$$
then
$$\sin x = \frac{2t}{1 + t^2};\qquad \cos x = \frac{1 - t^2}{1 + t^2};\qquad e^{i x} = \frac{1 + i t}{1 - i t}; \qquad dx = \frac{2\,dt}{1+t^2},$$
where $e^{i x} = \cos x + i \sin x,$ sometimes abbreviated to cis x.

When this substitution of $t$ for tan x/2 is used in calculus, it follows that $\sin x$ is replaced by 2t/(1 + t^{2}), $\cos x$ is replaced by (1 − t^{2})/(1 + t^{2}) and the differential dx is replaced by (2 dt)/(1 + t^{2}). Thereby one converts rational functions of $\sin x$ and $\cos x$ to rational functions of $t$ in order to find their antiderivatives.

=== Viète's infinite product ===
$$\cos\frac{\theta}{2} \cdot \cos \frac{\theta}{4}
\cdot \cos \frac{\theta}{8} \cdots = \prod_{n=1}^\infty \cos \frac{\theta}{2^n}
= \frac{\sin \theta}{\theta} = \operatorname{sinc} \theta.$$

=== A sine identity used in medical imaging ===
Here is an identity discovered as a by-product of research in medical imaging.

Let $i = \sqrt{-1}$ be the imaginary unit and let ∘ denote composition of differential operators. Then for every odd positive integer n,

$$\begin{align}
\sum_{k=0}^n \binom n k \left(\frac d {dx} - \sin x\right)
&\circ \left(\frac d {dx} - \sin x + i\right) \circ \cdots \\
\cdots &\circ \left(\frac d {dx} - \sin x + (k - 1)i\right) (\sin x)^{n-k} = 0.
\end{align}$$

(When k = 0, then the number of differential operators being composed is 0, so the corresponding term in the sum above is just (sin x)^{n}.)

=== Sum of Sines and Cosines of Arithmetic Sequences ===
Let $d \in \mathbb{R}$ be a real number such that $d \neq 2\pi k$ for $k \in \mathbb{Z}$. Then:

==== Sine formulation 1 ====
$$\begin{align}
\sum_{k=0}^n \cos (a + kd) = \frac{\sin (d(n+1)/2)}{\sin(d/2)}\sin\Big(a + \frac{nd}{2} \Big).
\end{align}$$

==== Sine formulation 2 ====
$$\begin{align}
\sum_{k=1}^n \cos (a + kd) = \frac{\sin (nd/2)}{\sin(d/2)}\sin\Big(a + \frac{n+1}{2}d \Big).
\end{align}$$

==== Cosine formulation 1 ====
$$\begin{align}
\sum_{k=0}^n \cos (a + kd) = \frac{\sin (d(n+1)/2)}{\sin(d/2)}\cos\Big(a + \frac{nd}{2} \Big).
\end{align}$$

==== Cosine formulation 2 ====
$$\begin{align}
\sum_{k=1}^n \cos (a + kd) = \frac{\sin (nd/2)}{\sin(d/2)}\cos\Big(a + \frac{n+1}{2}d \Big).
\end{align}$$

== See also ==
- Aristarchus's inequality
- Derivatives of trigonometric functions
- Exact trigonometric values (values of sine and cosine expressed in surds)
- Exsecant
- Half-side formula
- Hyperbolic function
- Laws for solution of triangles:
  - Law of cosines
    - Spherical law of cosines
  - Law of sines
  - Law of tangents
  - Law of cotangents
  - Mollweide's formula
- List of integrals of trigonometric functions
- Mnemonics in trigonometry
- Pentagramma mirificum
- Proofs of trigonometric identities
- Prosthaphaeresis
- Pythagorean theorem
- Tangent half-angle formula
- Trigonometric number
- Trigonometry
- Uses of trigonometry
- Versine and haversine

== Bibliography ==
- Abramowitz, Milton; Stegun, Irene A., eds. (1972). Handbook of Mathematical Functions with Formulas, Graphs, and Mathematical Tables. New York: Dover Publications. ISBN 978-0-486-61272-0.
- Nielsen, Kaj L. (1966), Logarithmic and Trigonometric Tables to Five Places (2nd ed.), New York: Barnes & Noble, LCCN 61-9103
- Selby, Samuel M., ed. (1970), Standard Mathematical Tables (18th ed.), The Chemical Rubber Co.
