= Half-side formula =

Relation between the side lengths and angles of a spherical triangle

Spherical triangle

In spherical trigonometry, the half-side formula relates the angles and lengths of the sides of spherical triangles, which are triangles drawn on the surface of a sphere and so have curved sides and do not obey the formulas for plane triangles.

For a triangle $\triangle ABC$ on a sphere, the half-side formula is
$$\begin{align}
\tan \tfrac12 a
&= \sqrt{\frac{-\cos(S)\, \cos(S - A)}
{\cos(S - B)\, \cos(S - C)} }
\end{align}$$
where a, b, c are the angular lengths (measure of central angle, arc lengths normalized to a sphere of unit radius) of the sides opposite angles A, B, C respectively, and $S = \tfrac12 (A+B+ C)$ is half the sum of the angles. Two more formulas can be obtained for $b$ and $c$ by permuting the labels $A, B, C.$

The polar dual relationship for a spherical triangle is the half-angle formula,
$$\begin{align}
\tan \tfrac12 A
&= \sqrt{\frac{\sin(s - b)\, \sin(s - c)}
{\sin(s)\, \sin(s - a)} }
\end{align}$$
where semiperimeter $s = \tfrac12 (a + b + c)$ is half the sum of the sides. Again, two more formulas can be obtained by permuting the labels $A, B, C.$

== Half-tangent variant ==
The same relationships can be written as rational equations of half-tangents (tangents of half-angles). If $t_a = \tan \tfrac12 a,$ $t_b = \tan \tfrac12 b,$ $t_c = \tan \tfrac12 c,$ $t_A = \tan \tfrac12 A,$ $t_B = \tan \tfrac12 B,$ and $t_C = \tan \tfrac12 C,$ then the half-side formula is equivalent to:
$$\begin{align}
t_a^2
&= \frac{\bigl(t_Bt_C + t_Ct_A + t_At_B - 1\bigr)\bigl({-t_Bt_C + t_Ct_A + t_At_B + 1}\bigr)}
{\bigl(t_Bt_C - t_Ct_A + t_At_B + 1\bigr)\bigl(t_Bt_C + t_Ct_A - t_At_B + 1\bigr)},
\end{align}$$
and the half-angle formula is equivalent to:
$$\begin{align}
t_A^2
&= \frac{\bigl(t_a - t_b + t_c + t_at_bt_c\bigr)\bigl(t_a + t_b - t_c + t_at_bt_c\bigr)}
{\bigl(t_a + t_b + t_c - t_at_bt_c\bigr)\bigl({-t_a + t_b + t_c + t_at_bt_c}\bigr)}.
\end{align}$$

== See also ==
- Spherical law of cosines
- Law of haversines
