= Pentagramma mirificum =

5-sided star shaped polygon

Sample configurations of pentagramma mirificum

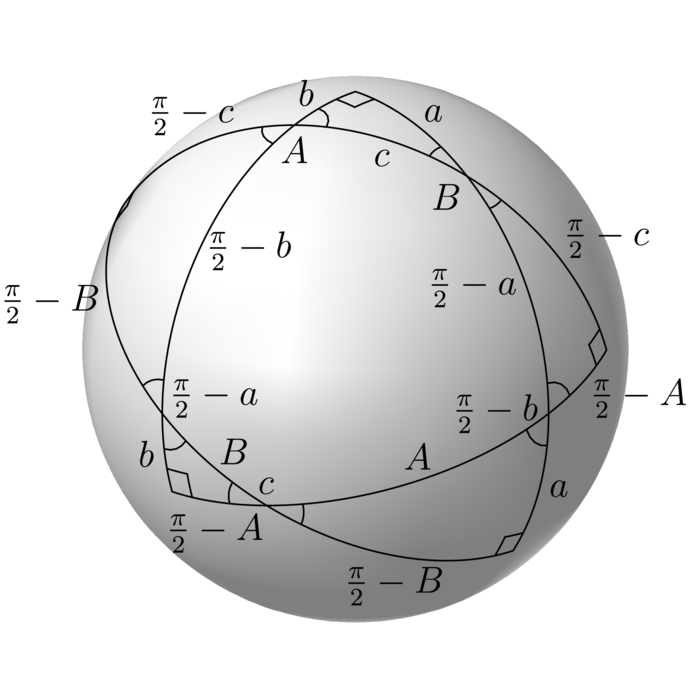
Relations between the angles and sides of five right triangles adjacent to the inner pentagon. Their Napier’s circles contain circular shifts of parts $(a,$ $\pi/2-B,$ $\pi/2-c,$ $\pi/2-A,$ $b)$

Pentagramma mirificum (Latin for "miraculous pentagram") is a star polygon on a sphere, composed of five great circle arcs, all of whose internal angles are right angles. This shape was described by John Napier in his 1614 book Mirifici Logarithmorum Canonis Descriptio (Description of the Admirable Table of Logarithms) along with rules that link the values of trigonometric functions of five parts of a right spherical triangle (two angles and three sides). The properties of pentagramma mirificum were studied, among others, by Carl Friedrich Gauss.

== Geometric properties ==
On a sphere, both the angles and the sides of a triangle (arcs of great circles) are measured as angles.

There are five right angles, each measuring $\pi/2,$ at $A$, $B$, $C$, $D$, and $E.$

There are ten arcs, each measuring $\pi/2:$ $PC$, $PE$, $QD$, $QA$, $RE$, $RB$, $SA$, $SC$, $TB$, and $TD.$

In the spherical pentagon $PQRST$, every vertex is the pole of the opposite side. For instance, point $P$ is the pole of equator $RS$, point $Q$ — the pole of equator $ST$, etc.

At each vertex of pentagon $PQRST$, the external angle is equal in measure to the opposite side. For instance, $\angle APT = \angle BPQ = RS,\; \angle BQP = \angle CQR = ST,$ etc.

Napier's circles of spherical triangles $APT$, $BQP$, $CRQ$, $DSR$, and $ETS$ are rotations of one another.

== Gauss's formulas ==
Gauss introduced the notation

$$(\alpha, \beta, \gamma, \delta, \varepsilon) = (\tan^2 TP, \tan^2 PQ, \tan^2 QR, \tan^2 RS, \tan^2 ST).$$

The following identities hold, allowing the determination of any three of the above quantities from the two remaining ones:

$$\begin{align}
1 + \alpha &= \gamma\delta  &1 + \beta &= \delta\varepsilon  &1 + \gamma &=\alpha \varepsilon \\
1 + \delta &= \alpha\beta  &1 + \varepsilon &= \beta\gamma.
\end{align}$$

Gauss proved the following "beautiful equality" (schöne Gleichung):

$$\begin{align}
\alpha\beta\gamma\delta\varepsilon &=\; 3 + \alpha + \beta + \gamma + \delta + \varepsilon \\
&=\; \sqrt{(1+\alpha)(1+\beta)(1+\gamma)(1+\delta)(1+\varepsilon)}.
\end{align}$$

It is satisfied, for instance, by numbers $(\alpha, \beta, \gamma, \delta, \varepsilon) = (9, 2/3, 2, 5, 1/3)$, whose product $\alpha\beta\gamma\delta\varepsilon$ is equal to $20$.

Proof of the first part of the equality:

$$\begin{align}
\alpha\beta\gamma\delta\varepsilon
&= \alpha\beta\gamma\left(\frac{1+\alpha}{\gamma}\right)\left(\frac{1+\gamma}{\alpha}\right)
= \beta(1+\alpha)(1+\gamma)\\
&= \beta + \alpha\beta + \beta\gamma + \alpha\beta\gamma = \beta + (1 + \delta) + (1 + \varepsilon) + \alpha(1 + \varepsilon) \\
&= 2 + \alpha + \beta + \delta + \varepsilon + 1 + \gamma \\
& = 3 + \alpha + \beta + \gamma + \delta + \varepsilon
\end{align}$$

Proof of the second part of the equality:

$$\begin{align}
\alpha\beta\gamma\delta\varepsilon &= \sqrt{\alpha^2\beta^2\gamma^2\delta^2\varepsilon^2} \\
&= \sqrt{\gamma\delta \cdot \delta\varepsilon \cdot \varepsilon\alpha \cdot \alpha\beta \cdot \beta\gamma}\\
&=   \sqrt{(1+\alpha)(1+\beta)(1+\gamma)(1+\delta)(1+\varepsilon)}
\end{align}$$

From Gauss comes also the formula

$$(1+i\sqrt{\alpha})(1+i\sqrt{\beta})(1+i\sqrt{\gamma})(1+i\sqrt{\delta})(1+i\sqrt{\varepsilon}) = \alpha\beta\gamma\delta\varepsilon e^{iS},$$
where $S = |\overset{\frown}{PQ}| + |\overset{\frown}{QR}| + |\overset{\frown}{RS}| + |\overset{\frown}{ST}| + |\overset{\frown}{TP}| = 2\pi -$ area of pentagon $PQRST$.

== Gnomonic projection ==
The image of spherical pentagon $PQRST$ in the gnomonic projection (a projection from the centre of the sphere) onto any plane tangent to the sphere is a rectilinear pentagon. Its five vertices $P'Q'R'S'T'$ unambiguously determine a conic section; in this case — an ellipse. Gauss showed that the altitudes of pentagram $P'Q'R'S'T'$ (lines passing through vertices and perpendicular to opposite sides) cross in one point $O'$, which is the image of the point of tangency of the plane to sphere.

Arthur Cayley observed that, if we set the origin of a Cartesian coordinate system in point $O'$, then the coordinates of vertices $P'Q'R'S'T'$: $(x_1, y_1),\ldots,$ $(x_5, y_5)$ satisfy the equalities $x_1 x_4 + y_1 y_4 =$ $x_2 x_5 + y_2 y_5 =$ $x_3 x_1 + y_3 y_1 =$ $x_4 x_2 + y_4 y_2 =$ $x_5 x_3 + y_5 y_3 = -\rho^2$, where $\rho$ is the length of the radius of the sphere.
