= Spherical law of cosines =

Mathematical relation in spherical triangles

In spherical trigonometry, the law of cosines (or, more specifically, the law of cosines for sides) is a theorem relating the three sides and one of the angles of a spherical triangle, analogous to the planar law of cosines for a triangle in the Euclidean plane.

Spherical triangle solved by the law of cosines.

A spherical triangle is a shape on a sphere consisting of three vertices (corner points) connected by three sides, each of which is part of a great circle, the analog on the sphere of a straight line in the plane (for example the equator and meridians of a globe). The arc lengths of the sides are proportional to the measures of the central angles they subtend. The angles between sides are dihedral angles between the planes containing them. In the image, u, v, and w represent three points on the sphere. If the angular lengths of the sides are a (from u to v), b (from u to w), and c (from v to w), and the angle of the corner opposite c is C, then the (first) spherical law of cosines states:
$$\cos c = \cos a \cos b + \sin a \sin b \cos C\,$$

As a special case, when C = π/2 then cos C = 0, resulting in the spherical analogue of the Pythagorean theorem:
$$\cos c = \cos a \cos b\,$$

If the law of cosines is used to solve for c, the necessity of inverting the cosine magnifies rounding errors when c is small. In this case, the alternative formulation of the law of haversines is preferable.

A second spherical law of cosines, sometimes called the law of cosines for angles, relates the three angles and one of the sides of a triangle:
$$\cos C = -\cos A \cos B + \sin A \sin B \cos c\,$$
where A and B are the angles of the corners opposite to sides a and b, respectively. It is related to the first law by polar duality.

== Proofs ==
=== First proof ===
Let u, v, and w denote the unit vectors from the center of a unit sphere to those corners of the triangle. The angles and distances do not change if the coordinate system is rotated, so we can rotate the coordinate system so that $\mathbf{u}$ is at the north pole and $\mathbf{v}$ is somewhere on the prime meridian (longitude of 0). With this rotation, the spherical coordinates for $\mathbf{v}$ are $(r, \theta, \phi) = (1, a, 0) ,$ where θ is the angle measured from the north pole not from the equator, and the spherical coordinates for $\mathbf{w}$ are $(r, \theta, \phi) = (1, b, C) .$ The Cartesian coordinates for $\mathbf{v}$ are $(x, y, z) = (\sin a, 0, \cos a)$ and the Cartesian coordinates for $\mathbf{w}$ are $(x, y, z) = (\sin b \cos C, \sin b \sin C, \cos b) .$ The value of $\cos c$ is the dot product of the two Cartesian vectors, which is $\sin a \sin b \cos C + \cos a \cos b .$

=== Second proof ===
Let u, v, and w denote the unit vectors from the center of the sphere to those corners of the triangle. We have u · u = 1, v · w = cos c, u · v = cos a, and u · w = cos b. The vectors u × v and u × w have lengths sin a and sin b respectively and the angle between them is C, so
$$\begin{align}
\sin a \sin b \cos C &= (\bold u \times \bold v) \cdot (\bold u \times \bold w) \\
&= (\bold u \cdot \bold u)(\bold v \cdot \bold w) - (\bold u \cdot \bold w)(\bold v \cdot \bold u) \\
&= \cos c - \cos a \cos b
\end{align}$$
using cross products, dot products, and the Binet–Cauchy identity
$$(\bold p \times \bold q) \cdot (\bold r \times \bold s) = (\bold p \cdot \bold r)(\bold q \cdot \bold s) - (\bold p \cdot \bold s)(\bold q \cdot \bold r).$$

=== Third proof ===
There is a proof using quaternions. Let u, v, and w denote the unit vectors from the center of the unit sphere to those corners of the triangle. We define the quaternion u = (0, u) = 0 + u_{x}i + u_{y}j + u_{z}k. The quaternion u is used to represent a rotation by 180° around the axis indicated by the vector u. We note that using −u as the axis of rotation gives the same result, and that the rotation is its own inverse. We also define v = (0, v) and w = (0, w).

We compute the product of quaternions, which also gives the composition of the corresponding rotations:
$$q = vu^{-1} = (v)(-u) = (-(\bold v \cdot -\bold u), \bold v \times -\bold u) = (\bold u \cdot \bold v, \bold u \times \bold v) = (\cos a, \bold w' \sin a)$$
where (f, g) represents the real (scalar) and imaginary (vector) parts of a quaternion, a is the angle between u and v, and w′ = (u × v) / |u × v| is the axis of the rotation that moves u to v along a great circle. Similarly we define:
$$\begin{align}
r &= wv^{-1} = (\bold v \cdot \bold w, \bold v \times \bold w) = (\cos c, \bold u' \sin c) \\
s &= uw^{-1} = (\bold w \cdot \bold u, \bold w \times \bold u) = (\cos b, \bold v' \sin b). \\
\end{align}$$

The quaternions q, r, and s are used to represent rotations with axes of rotation w′, u′, and v′, respectively, and angles of rotation 2a, 2b, and 2c, respectively. (Because these are double angles, each of q, r, and s represents two applications of the rotation implied by an edge of the spherical triangle.)

From the definitions, it follows that
$$qsr = vu^{-1}uw^{-1}wv^{-1} = 1,$$
which tells us that the composition of these rotations is the identity transformation. In particular, qs = r^{−1} gives us
$$(\cos a, \bold w' \sin a) (\cos b, \bold v' \sin b) = (\cos c, -\bold u' \sin c).$$

Expanding the left-hand side, we obtain
$$(\cos a \cos b - \bold w' \cdot \bold v' \sin a \sin b, \bold w' \cos a \sin b + \bold v' \sin a \cos b  + \bold w' \times \bold v' \sin a \sin b).$$

Equating the real parts on both sides of the identity, we obtain
$$\cos a \cos b - \bold w' \cdot \bold v' \sin a \sin b = \cos c.$$

Because w′ is parallel to u × v, v′ is parallel to w × u = −u × w, and C is the angle between u × v and u × w, it follows that $\bold w' \cdot \bold v' = -\cos C$. Thus,
$$\cos a \cos b + \cos C \sin a \sin b = \cos c.$$

== Rearrangements ==
The first and second spherical laws of cosines can be rearranged to put the sides (a, b, c) and angles (A, B, C) on opposite sides of the equations:
$$\begin{align}
\cos C &= \frac{\cos c - \cos a \cos b}{\sin a \sin b} \\
\cos c &= \frac{\cos C + \cos A \cos B}{\sin A \sin B} \\
\end{align}$$

== Planar limit: small angles ==
For small spherical triangles, i.e. for small a, b, and c, the spherical law of cosines is approximately the same as the ordinary planar law of cosines,
$$c^2 \approx a^2 + b^2 - 2ab\cos C \,.$$

To prove this, we will use the small-angle approximation obtained from the Maclaurin series for the cosine and sine functions:
$$\begin{align}
\cos a &= 1 - \frac{a^2}{2} + O\left(a^4\right) \\
\sin a &= a + O\left(a^3\right)
\end{align}$$

Substituting these expressions into the spherical law of cosines nets:
$$1 - \frac{c^2}{2} + O\left(c^4\right) =
1 - \frac{a^2}{2} - \frac{b^2}{2} + \frac{a^2 b^2}{4} + O\left(a^4\right) + O\left(b^4\right) + \cos(C)\left(ab + O\left(a^3 b\right) + O\left(ab^3\right) + O\left(a^3 b^3\right)\right)$$
or after simplifying:
$$c^2 = a^2 + b^2 - 2ab\cos C + O\left(c^4\right) + O\left(a^4\right) + O\left(b^4\right) + O\left(a^2 b^2\right) + O\left(a^3 b\right) + O\left(ab^3\right) + O\left(a^3 b^3\right).$$

The big O terms for a and b are dominated by O(a^{4}) + O(b^{4}) as a and b get small, so we can write this last expression as:
$$c^2 = a^2 + b^2 - 2ab\cos C + O\left(a^4\right) + O\left(b^4\right) + O\left(c^4\right).$$

== History ==
Various trigonometric equations equivalent to the spherical law of cosines were used in the course of solving astronomical problems by medieval Islamic astronomers al-Khwārizmī (9th century) and al-Battānī (c. 900), Indian astronomer Nīlakaṇṭha (15th century), and Austrian astronomer Georg von Peuerbach (15th century) but none of them treated it as a general method for solving spherical triangles. For example, al-Khwārizmī calculated the azimuth $\alpha$ of the Sun in terms of its altitude $h$, terrestrial latitude $\phi$, and ortive amplitude $\psi$ (angular distance between due East and the Sun's rising place on the horizon) as $\cos \alpha = (\sin\psi - \tan\phi \sin h)/\cos h$. (See Horizontal coordinate system.)

The spherical law of cosines appeared as an independent trigonometrical identity for solving spherical triangles in Peuerbach's student Regiomontanus's De triangulis omnimodis (unfinished at Regiomontanus's death in 1476, published posthumously 1533), a foundational work for European trigonometry and astronomy which comprehensively described how to solve plane and spherical triangles. Regiomontanus used nearly the modern form, but written in terms of the versine, $\operatorname{vers} x = 1 - \cos x$, rather than the cosine,
$$\frac{\operatorname{vers} C}{\operatorname{vers} c - \operatorname{vers}(a-b)} = \frac{1}{\sin a \sin b}.$$

Mathematical historians have speculated that Regiomontanus may have adapted the result from specific astronomical examples in al-Battānī's Kitāb az-Zīj aṣ-Ṣābi’, which was published in Latin translation annotated by Regiomontanus in 1537.

== See also ==
- Half-side formula
- Hyperbolic law of cosines
- Solution of triangles
- Spherical law of sines
