= Free stationing =

In surveying, free stationing (also known as resection) is a method of determining a location of one unknown point in relation to known points. There is a zero point of reference called a total station. The instrument can be freely positioned so that all survey points are at a suitable sight from the instrument. When setting up the total station on a known point, it is often not possible to see all survey points of interest. When performing a resection (free stationing) with the total station, bearings and distances are measured to at least two known points of a control network. With use of a handheld computer, recorded data can be related to local polar coordinates, defined by the horizontal circle of the total station. By a geometric transformation, these polar coordinates are transformed to the coordinate system of the control network. Error can be distributed by least squares adjustment. Upon completion of observations and calculations, a coordinate is produced, and the position and orientation of the total station in relation to where the control network is established.

== Comparison of methods ==
- Angular resection and triangulation: only bearings are measured to the known points.
- Trilateration: only distances are measured to the known points.
- Free stationing and triangulateration: both bearings and distances are measured to the known points.

== Naming ==
Because bearings and distances are measured in a full resection (free stationing), the result may have a different mathematical solution. This method has different names in other languages, e.g. in German: Freie Standpunktwahl (free stationing). Naming is also regulated by the German Institute for Standardization DIN 18 709.

== Different mathematical solution ==
The axes and circles of a theodolite

Points in the polar coordinate system with pole O and polar axis L. In green, the point with radial coordinate 3 and angular coordinate 60 degrees or (3,60°). In blue, the point (4,210°).

By measuring bearings and distances, local polar coordinates are recorded. The orientation of this local polar coordinate system is defined by the 0° horizontal circle of the total station (polar axis L). The pole of this local polar coordinate system is the vertical axis (pole O) of the total station. The polar coordinates (r,f) with the pole are transformed using surveying software on a data collector to the Cartesian coordinates (x,y) of the known points. The coordinates for the position of the total station are then calculated.

In a resection (triangulation) measuring bearings only, there can be a problem with an infinite number of solutions known as a "danger circle", or "inscribed angle theorem".

The back-sight points of the control network should cover and surround the stationing site. The position of the total station is not part of the area. This is the area where you want to measure with this station setup. Topographic points or stakeout points should not be measured outside this area. If measured outside this area, the errors in orientation will be extrapolated instead of being interpolated.

While it is possible to use only two known control points in a resection (free stationing), it is recommended to use three control points. There is no redundancy for orientation, using two points only.

== Advantages ==
The surveyor may freely set a station point:

- Where there is best visibility to all points that must be staked out or recorded
- Where there are no obstructions or traffic
- Where there is the highest safety for the operator and the instrument

Because of the range and accuracy of total stations, the method of a resection (free stationing) permits a great freedom of positioning the total station. For this reason, this method is one of the most used station set ups.

== Application ==
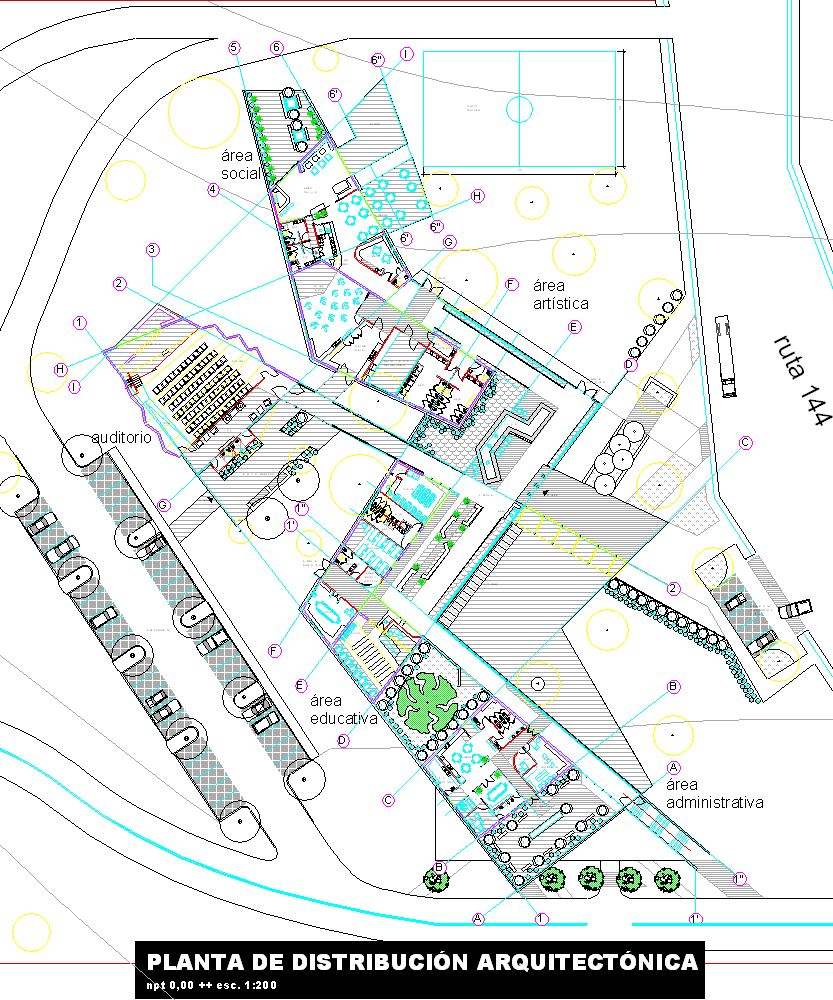
Example of a site plan

With the calculated coordinates and orientation of the total station, it can be used to set out points in construction surveying, machine guidance, site plan or other types of surveys.
