= Resection =

Resection may refer to:

- Resection (surgery), the removal by surgery of all or part of an organ or other body structure
- Segmental resection (or segmentectomy), the partial removal of an organ or other body structure
- Position resection and intersection, a means of establishing a location by measuring angles only to known points
- Free stationing Resection, a means of establishing a position and orientation of a total station by measuring angles and distances to known points
- DNA end resection, the process of cutting away the 5′ side of a blunt end of double-stranded DNA
