= Included angle =

The concept of included angle is discussed at:

- Congruence of triangles
- Solution of triangles
