= Total station =

Electro-optical instrument used in surveying and building construction

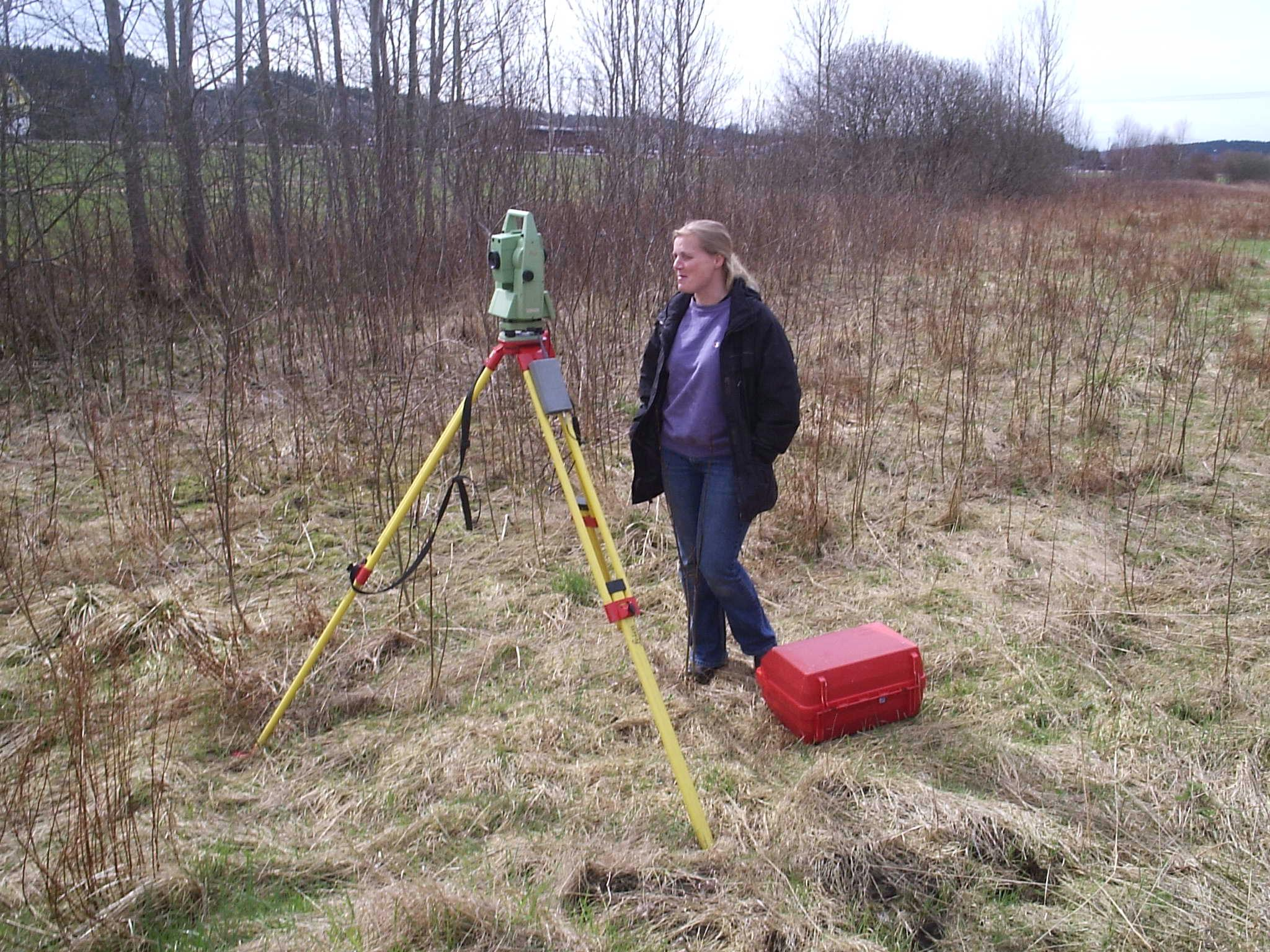
Archaeological survey using a Leica TPS1100 total station on an Iron Age dwelling in Ytterby, Sweden

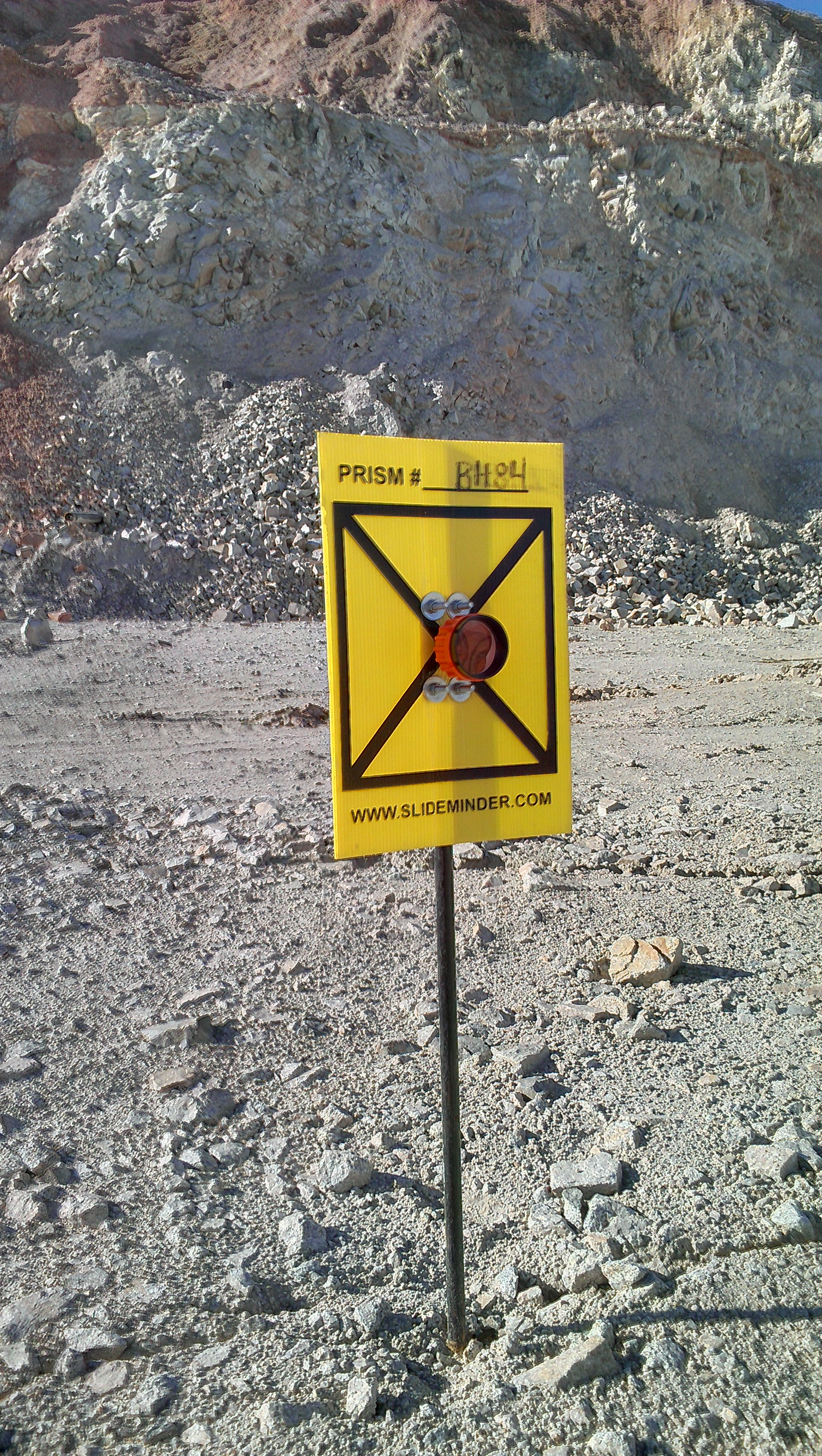
A typical prism with back target. Used with survey and 3D point monitoring systems to measure changes in elevation and position of a point.

A total station or total station theodolite, also known as a jigger, is an electronic/optical instrument used for surveying and building construction. It is an electronic transit theodolite integrated with electronic distance measurement (EDM) to measure both vertical and horizontal angles and the slope distance from the instrument to a particular point, and an on-board computer to collect data and perform triangulation and position resection and intersection calculations.

Robotic or motorized total stations allow the operator to control the instrument from a distance via remote control. In theory, this eliminates the need for an assistant staff member, as the operator holds the retroreflector and controls the total station from the observed point. In practice, however, an assistant surveyor is often needed when the surveying is being conducted in busy areas such as on a public carriageway or construction site. This is to prevent people from disrupting the total station as they walk past, which would necessitate resetting the tripod and re-establishing a baseline. Additionally, an assistant surveyor discourages opportunistic theft, which is not uncommon due to the value of the instrument. If all else fails, most total stations have serial numbers. In the United States the National Society of Professional Surveyors hosts a registry of stolen equipment which can be checked by institutions that service surveying equipment to prevent stolen instruments from circulating. These motorized total stations can also be used in automated setups known as "automated motorized total station".

== Function ==
=== Angle measurement ===
Most total station instruments measure angles by means of electro-optical scanning of extremely precise digital bar-codes etched on rotating glass cylinders or discs within the instrument. The best quality total stations are capable of measuring angles within a standard deviation of 0.5 arc-seconds. Inexpensive "construction grade" total stations can generally measure angles within standard deviations of 5 or 10 arc-seconds.

Angle measurement is typically performed by the operator first occupying a known point, aiming the head of the instrument at a target or prism which exists at either another known point or along an azimuth, which is to be held as a backsight — sighting with the reticle inside the eyepiece — then holding that line as an angle of 00°00‘̣00“̣. The operator then will turn the head of the instrument at a target or feature that is to be observed as a foresight and record the AR (Angle Right) from the backsight measured by the instrument in which a horizontal angle is produced. Angular error in the instrument as well as collimation error can be mitigated in many total stations by performing a set collection. This entails witnessing any angles recorded an equal number of times in both "direct" and "reverse" modes by sighting the observed backsight and foresights with the instrument facing the targets normally as well as with the scope flipped or "plunged" 180°. The recorded sets of angles taken from each target will be averaged together and a mean angle will be generated.

=== Distance measurement ===
Measurement of distance is accomplished with a modulated infrared carrier signal, generated by a small solid-state emitter within the instrument's optical path, and reflected by a prism reflector or the object under survey. The modulation pattern in the returning signal is read and interpreted by the computer in the total station. The distance is determined by emitting and receiving multiple frequencies, and determining the integer number of wavelengths to the target for each frequency. Most total stations use purpose-built glass prism (surveying) reflectors for the EDM signal. A typical total station can measure distances up to 1,500 meters (4,900 ft) with an accuracy of about 1.5 millimeters (0.059 in) ± 2 parts per million.

Reflectorless total stations can measure distances to any object that is reasonably light in color, up to a few hundred meters.

=== Coordinate measurement ===
The coordinates of an unknown point relative to a point with known coordinates can be determined using the total station as long as a direct line of sight can be established between the two points. Angles and distances are measured from the total station to points under survey, and the coordinates (X, Y, and Z; or easting, northing, and elevation) of surveyed points relative to the total station position are calculated using trigonometry and triangulation.

To determine an absolute location, a total station requires line of sight observations and can be set up over a known point or with line of sight to 2 or more points with known locations, called free stationing.

For this reason, some total stations also have a global navigation satellite system (GNSS) receiver and do not require a direct line of sight to determine coordinates. However, GNSS measurements may require longer occupation periods and offer relatively poor accuracy in the vertical axis.

=== Data processing ===
Some models include internal electronic data storage to record distance, horizontal angle, and vertical angle measured, while other models are equipped to write these measurements to an external data collector, such as a hand-held computer.

When data is downloaded from a total station onto a computer, application software can be used to compute results and generate a map of the surveyed area. The newest generation of total stations can also show the map on the touch-screen of the instrument immediately after measuring the points.

== Applications ==
Most large-scale excavation or mapping projects benefit greatly from the proficient use of total stations. They are mainly used by land surveyors and civil engineers, either to record features as in topographic surveying or to set out features (such as roads, houses or boundaries). They are used by police, crime scene investigators, private accident reconstructionists and insurance companies to take measurements of scenes. Total stations are also employed by archaeologists, offering millimeter accuracy difficult to achieve using other tools as well as flexibility in setup location. They prove crucial in recording artifact locations, architectural dimensions, and site topography.

=== Mining ===
Total stations are the primary survey instrument used in mining surveying.

A total station is used to record the absolute location of the tunnel walls, ceilings (backs), and floors, as the drifts of an underground mine are driven. The recorded data are then downloaded into a CAD program and compared to the designed layout of the tunnel.

The survey party installs control stations at regular intervals. These are small steel plugs installed in pairs in holes drilled into walls or the back. For wall stations, two plugs are installed in opposite walls, forming a line perpendicular to the drift. For back stations, two plugs are installed in the back, forming a line parallel to the drift.

A set of plugs can be used to locate the total station set up in a drift or tunnel by processing measurements to the plugs by intersection and resection.

=== Mechanical and electrical construction ===
Total stations have become the highest standard for most forms of construction layout.

They are most often used in the X and Y axes to lay out the locations of penetrations out of the underground utilities into the foundation, between floors of a structure, as well as roofing penetrations.

Because more commercial and industrial construction jobs have become centered around building information modeling (BIM), the coordinates for almost every pipe, conduit, duct and hanger support are available with digital precision. The application of communicating a virtual model to a tangible construction potentially eliminates labor costs related to moving poorly measured systems, as well as time spent laying out these systems in the midst of a full-blown construction job in progress.

=== Meteorology ===
Meteorologists also use total stations to track weather balloons for determining upper-level winds. With the average ascent rate of the weather balloon known or assumed, the change in azimuth and elevation readings provided by the total station as it tracks the weather balloon over time are used to compute the wind speed and direction at different altitudes. Additionally, the total station is used to track ceiling balloons to determine the height of cloud layers. Such upper-level wind data is often used for aviation weather forecasting and rocket launches.

== Instrument manufacturers ==
- Carl Zeiss (historical)
- GeoMax, part of Hexagon AB
- Hewlett-Packard (historical)
- Hilti Corporation
- Leica Geosystems, part of Hexagon AB
- Nikon, part of Trimble
- North Group LTD (historical)
- Sokkia, part of Topcon
- South Group
- Spectra Geospatial, part of Trimble Navigation Ltd.
- Stonex (company)
- TI Asahi Co. Ltd, sold under the Pentax brand
- Topcon
- Trimble Navigation Ltd.
- Wild Heerbrugg AG (historical), part of Leica Geosystems

== See also ==
- Compass
- LIDAR
- Local attraction
- Resection (free stationing)
- Surveying
- Tacheometry
- Theodolite
- Trigonometric leveling
