= Congruence of triangles =

Congruence of triangles may refer to:

- Congruence (geometry)#Congruence of triangles
- Solution of triangles
