= Side-side-side =

Side-side-side is a means of analyzing triangles discussed at:

- Solution of triangles § Three sides given (SSS)
- SSS postulate
