= Peter Andreas Hansen =

German astronomer (1795–1874)

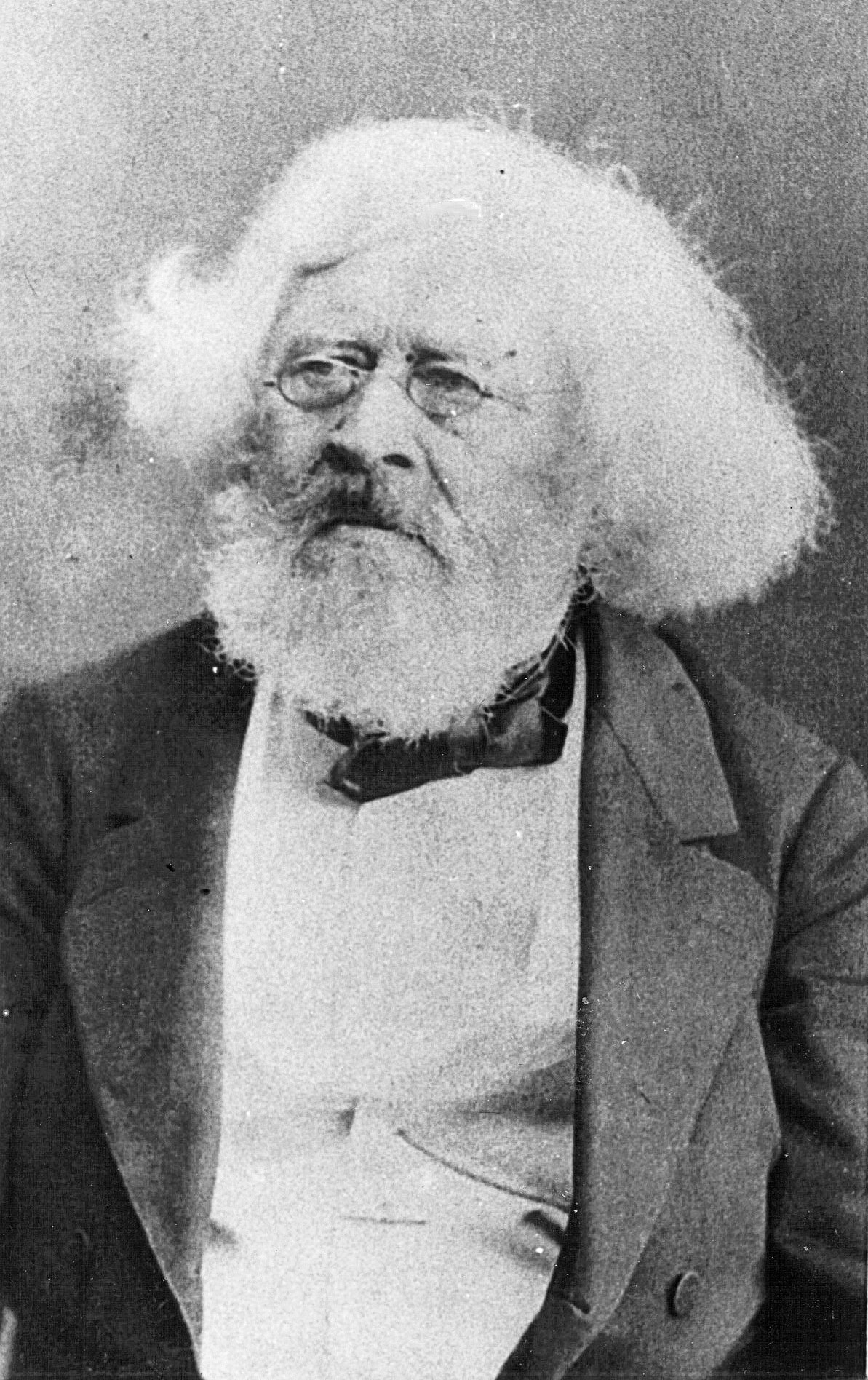
- Peter Andreas Hansen
- Born: 8 December 1795; Tønder, Schleswig, Denmark
- Died: 28 March 1874 (aged 78); Gotha, Thuringia, Germany
- Known for: Hansen hypothesis
- Awards: Gold Medal of the Royal Astronomical Society (1842, 1860); Copley Medal (1850)
- Scientific career
- Fields: Astronomy

Peter Andreas Hansen (born 8 December 1795, Tønder, Schleswig, Denmark; died 28 March 1874, Gotha, Thuringia, Germany) was a Danish-born German astronomer.

== Biography ==
The son of a goldsmith, Hansen learned the trade of a watchmaker at Flensburg, and exercised it at Berlin and Tønder, 1818–1820. He had, however, long been a student of science; and Dr Dircks, a physician practising at Tønder, prevailed with his father to send him in 1820 to Copenhagen, where he won the patronage of H.C. Schumacher and attracted the personal notice of King Frederick VI. The Danish survey was then in progress, and he acted as Schumacher's assistant in work connected with it, chiefly at the new observatory of Altona, from 1821 to 1825.

Thence he passed on to Gotha as director of the Gotha Observatory; nor could he be tempted to relinquish the post by successive invitations to replace F.G.W. Struve at Dorpat in 1829, Friedrich Wilhelm August Argelander at Helsinki in 1837, and F. W. Bessel at Königsberg in 1847. The problems of gravitational astronomy engaged the chief part of Hansen's attention. A research into the mutual perturbations of Jupiter and Saturn secured for him the prize of the Berlin Academy in 1830, and a memoir on cometary disturbances was crowned by the Paris Academy in 1850.

In 1838 he published a revision of the lunar theory, entitled Fundamenta nova investigationis, &c., and the improved Tables of the Moon ("Hansen's Lunar Tables") based upon it were printed in 1857, at the expense of the British government, their merit being further recognized by a grant of £1000, and by their adoption in the Nautical Almanac as from the issue for the year 1862, and other Ephemerides. A theoretical discussion of the disturbances embodied in them (long familiarly known to lunar experts as the Darlegung) appeared in the Abhandlungen of the Saxon Academy of Sciences in 1862 to 1864. At the time of publication of Hansen's Tables of the Moon in 1857, astronomers generally believed that the lunar theory was at last complete; but within about a decade, it was noticed, and shown by Simon Newcomb, that the optimism had been unfounded: deviations between computed and observed positions began to grow at a rate showing that further refinement was necessary. For some years Hansen's theory continued to be used with Newcomb's corrections (from the Nautical Almanac's issue for 1883), but it was eventually (as from 1923) superseded by E. W. Brown's theory. He was the first president of the Permanent Commission (1864-1868) of the Central European Arc Measurement (German: Mitteleuropäische Gradmessung), which became the European arc Measurement (1867-1886), then the International Geodetic Association (German: Internationale Erdmessung).

Hansen twice visited Britain and was twice (in 1842 and 1860) the recipient of the Gold Medal of the Royal Astronomical Society. He communicated to that society in 1847 an able paper on a long-period lunar inequality (Memoirs Roy. Astr. Society, xvi. 465), and in 1854 one on the Moon's figure, advocating the mistaken hypothesis of its deformation by a huge elevation directed towards the Earth (ib. xxiv. 29). He was awarded the Copley Medal by the Royal Society in 1850, and his Solar Tables, compiled with the assistance of Christian Olufsen, appeared in 1854. Hansen gave in 1854 the first intimation that the accepted distance of the sun was too great by some millions of miles (Month. Notices Roy. Astr. Soc. xv. 9), the error of J.F. Encke's result having been rendered evident through his investigation of a lunar inequality. In 1865, he was elected a foreign member of the Royal Swedish Academy of Sciences.

He died on 28 March 1874, at the new observatory in the town of Gotha, erected under his care in 1857.

Minor planet 4775 Hansen is named after him.

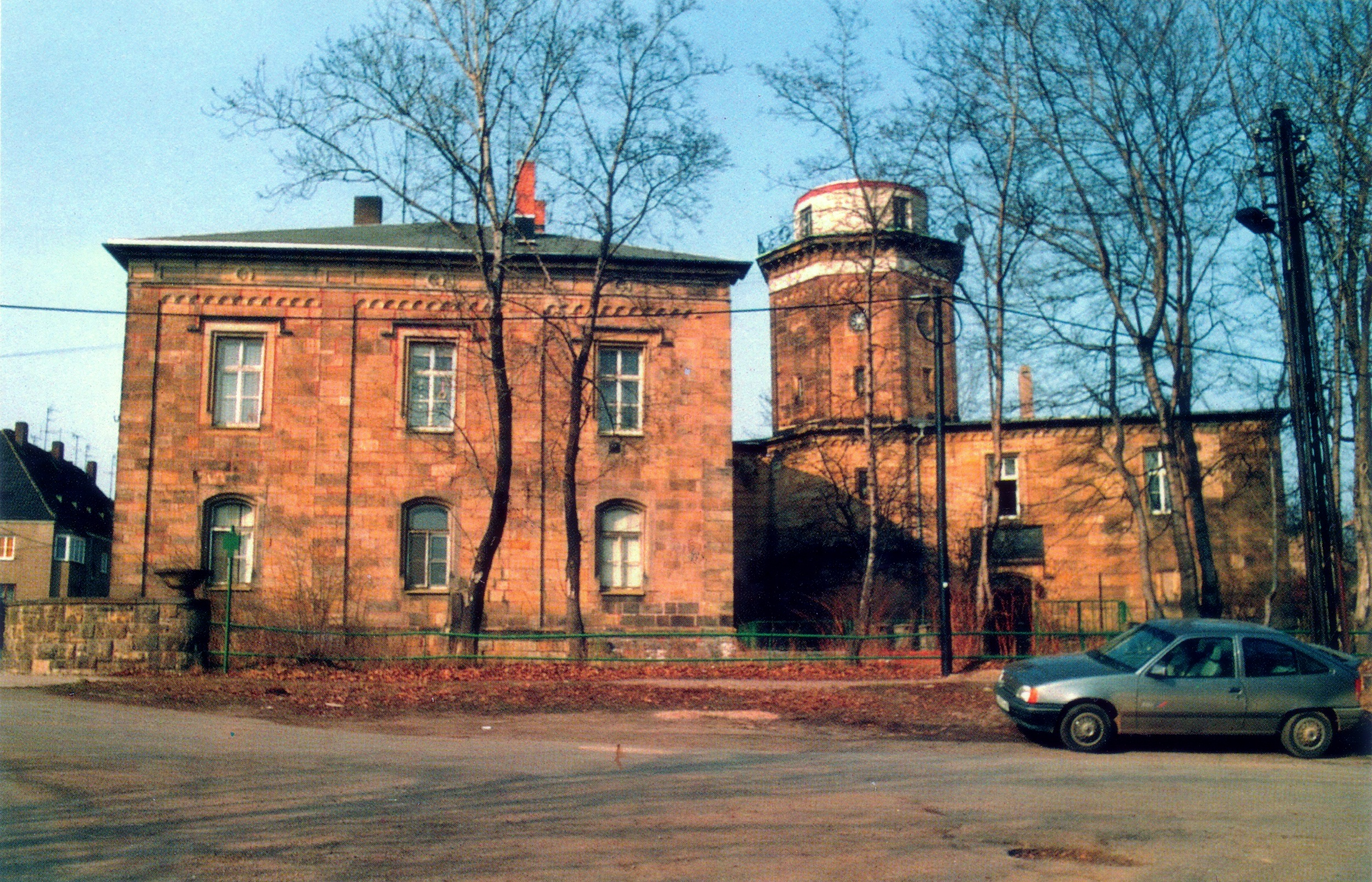
Gotha Observatory

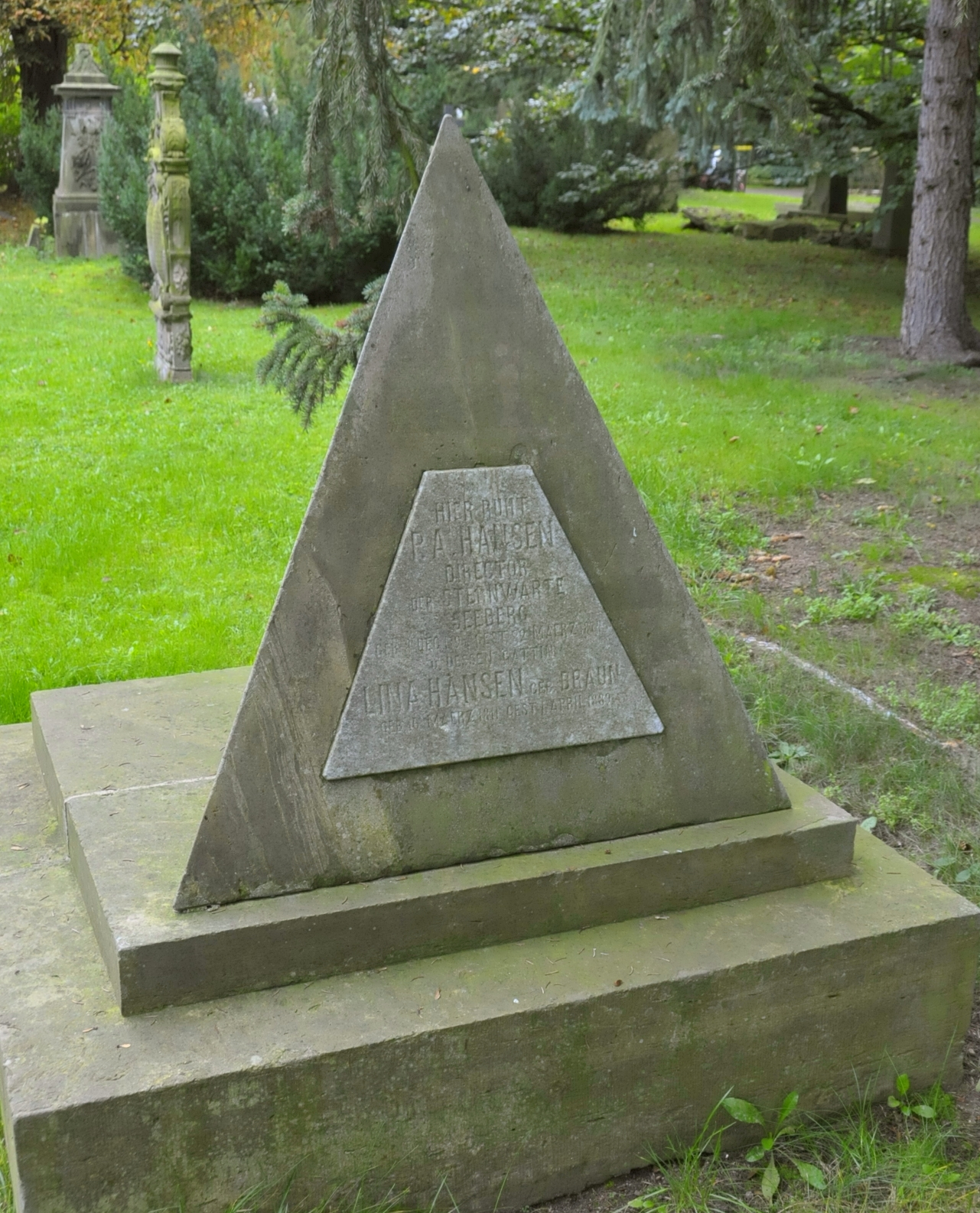
Hansen's grave in Gotha

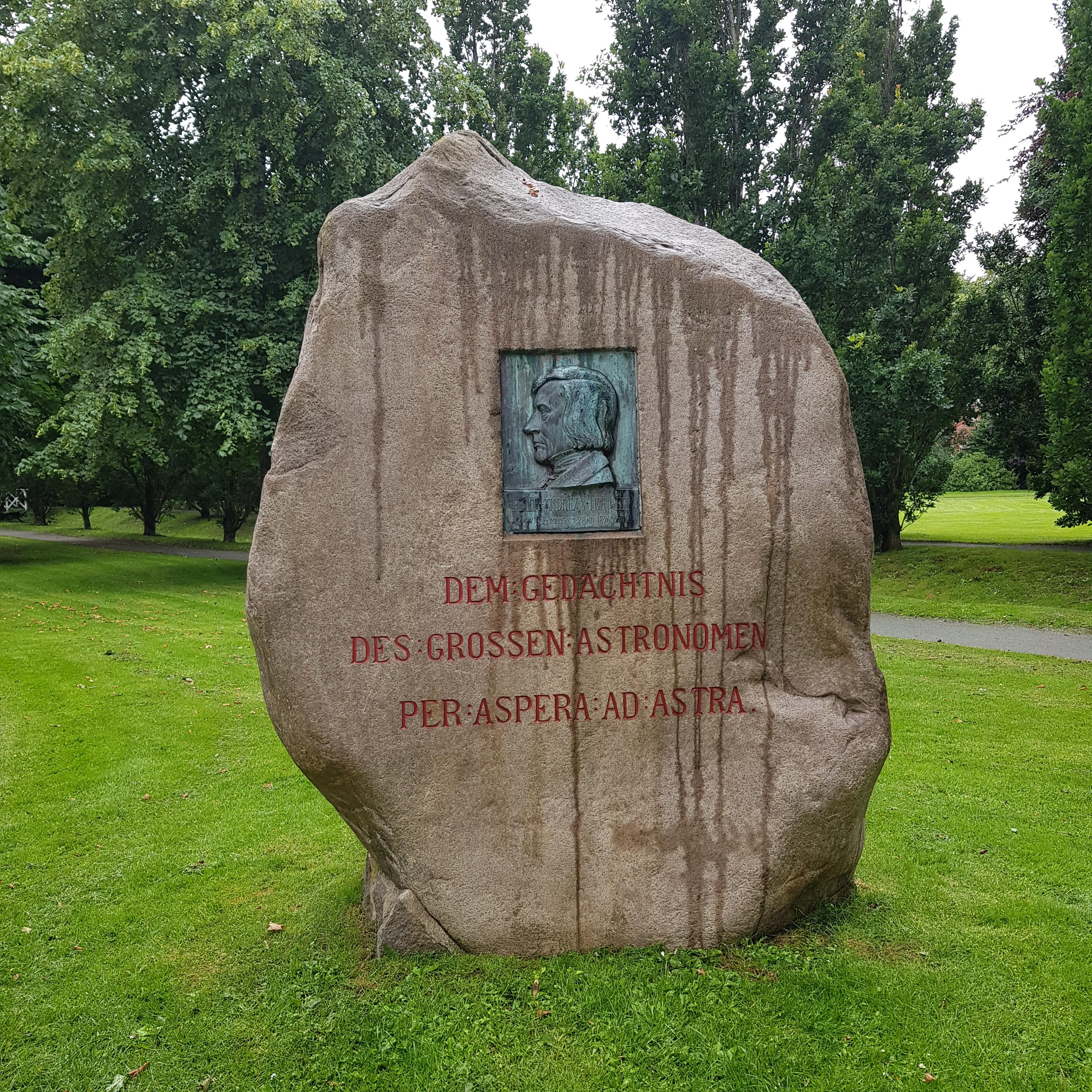
Memorial stone in Tønder in Denmark, erected in 1935

== See also ==
- Hansen's problem
