= 1346 Gotha =

Main-belt asteroid

Discovery
- Discovered by: K. Reinmuth
- Discovery site: Heidelberg Obs.
- Discovery date: 5 February 1929

Designations
- Named after: Gotha (German city in Thuringia)
- Alternative designations: 1929 CY · 1931 RC_{1} 1948 PL_{1} · 1952 OC
- Minor planet category: main-belt · (middle) background · Eunomia

Orbital characteristics
- Epoch 27 April 2019 (JD 2458600.5)
- Uncertainty parameter 0
- Observation arc: 90.53 yr (33,065 d)
- Aphelion: 3.0948 AU
- Perihelion: 2.1599 AU
- Semi-major axis: 2.6274 AU
- Eccentricity: 0.1779
- Orbital period (sidereal): 4.26 yr (1,556 d)
- Mean anomaly: 147.30°
- Mean motion: 0° 13^{m} 53.04^{s} / day
- Inclination: 13.849°
- Longitude of ascending node: 166.12°
- Argument of perihelion: 250.00°

Physical characteristics
- Mean diameter: 13.731±0.120 km 13.747±0.325 km
- Synodic rotation period: 2.64067±0.00002 h
- Geometric albedo: 0.278±0.009; 0.2794±0.0411
- Spectral type: S (est.); B–V = 0.840
- Absolute magnitude (H): 11.25; 11.32; 11.4

1346 Gotha, provisional designation 1929 CY, is a stony background asteroid from the central regions of the asteroid belt, approximately 14 kilometers (8.7 mi) in diameter. It was discovered on 5 February 1929, by astronomer Karl Reinmuth at the Heidelberg-Königstuhl State Observatory in southwest Germany. The presumed S-type asteroid has a short rotation period of 2.6 hours. It was named for the German city of Gotha, located in Thuringia.

== Orbit and classification ==
Based on the hierarchical clustering method, Gotha is a non-family asteroid of the main belt's background population (Nesvorny), but it has also been considered a core member of the Eunomia family by Novakovic, Knezevic and Milani. It orbits the Sun in the central main-belt at a distance of 2.2–3.1 AU once every 4 years and 3 months (1,556 days; semi-major axis of 2.63 AU). Its orbit has an eccentricity of 0.18 and an inclination of 14° with respect to the ecliptic. The body's observation arc begins with its official discovery observation at Heidelberg in 1929.

== Naming ==
This minor planet was named after the city of Gotha, located near Erfurt capital of the Free State of Thuringia, Germany. The asteroids 1254 Erfordia and 934 Thüringia are also named after these places. The city is known for its Gotha Observatory and the work of astronomer Franz Xaver von Zach (1754–1832), who recovered the dwarf planet Ceres and after whom 999 Zachia was named. The official naming citation was mentioned in The Names of the Minor Planets by Paul Herget in 1955 (H 122).

== Physical characteristics ==
Gotha has been estimated to be a stony S-type asteroid.

=== Rotation period ===
Several rotational lightcurves of Gotha have been obtained from photometric observations since 1984. Lightcurve analysis gave a consolidated rotation period of 2.64067 hours with a brightness variation between 0.10 and 0.16 magnitude (U=3-).

=== Diameter and albedo ===
According to the survey carried out by the NEOWISE mission of NASA's Wide-field Infrared Survey Explorer, Gotha measures between 13.731 and 13.747 kilometers in diameter and its surface has an albedo between 0.278 and 0.2794. The Collaborative Asteroid Lightcurve Link assumes a standard albedo for stony asteroids of 0.20 and derives a diameter of 16.18 kilometers based on an absolute magnitude of 11.32.
