= Position resection and intersection =

Methods in position finding

Position resection and intersection are methods for determining an unknown geographic position (position finding) by measuring angles with respect to known positions. In resection, the one point with unknown coordinates is occupied and sightings are taken to the known points; in intersection, the two points with known coordinates are occupied and sightings are taken to the unknown point.

Measurements can be made with a compass and topographic map (or nautical chart), theodolite or with a total station using known points of a geodetic network or landmarks of a map.

== Resection versus intersection ==
Resection and its related method, intersection, are used in surveying as well as in general land navigation (including inshore marine navigation using shore-based landmarks). Both methods involve taking azimuths or bearings to two or more objects, then drawing lines of position along those recorded bearings or azimuths.

When intersecting, lines of position are used to fix the position of an unmapped feature or point by fixing its position relative to two (or more) mapped or known points, the method is known as intersection. At each known point (hill, lighthouse, etc.), the navigator measures the bearing to the same unmapped target, drawing a line on the map from each known position to the target. The target is located where the lines intersect on the map. In earlier times, the intersection method was used by forest agencies and others using specialized alidades to plot the (unknown) location of an observed forest fire from two or more mapped (known) locations, such as forest fire observer towers.

The reverse of the intersection technique is appropriately termed resection. Resection simply reverses the intersection process by using crossed back bearings, where the navigator's position is the unknown. Two or more bearings to mapped, known points are taken; their resultant lines of position drawn from those points to where they intersect will reveal the navigator's location.

== In navigation ==
When resecting or fixing a position, the geometric strength (angular disparity) of the mapped points affects the precision and accuracy of the outcome. Accuracy increases as the angle between the two position lines approaches 90 degrees. Magnetic bearings are observed on the ground from the point under location to two or more features shown on a map of the area. Lines of reverse bearings, or lines of position, are then drawn on the map from the known features; two and more lines provide the resection point (the navigator's location). When three or more lines of position are utilized, the method is often popularly (though erroneously) referred to as triangulation (in precise terms, using three or more lines of position is still correctly called resection, as angular law of tangents (cot) calculations are not performed). When using a map and compass to perform resection, it is important to allow for the difference between the magnetic bearings observed and grid north (or true north) bearings (magnetic declination) of the map or chart.

Resection continues to be employed in land and inshore navigation today, as it is a simple and quick method requiring only an inexpensive magnetic compass and map/chart.

== In surveying ==
In surveying work, the most common methods of computing the coordinates of a point by angular resection are the Collin's "Q" point method (after John Collins) as well as the Cassini's Method (after Giovanni Domenico Cassini) and the Tienstra formula, though the first known solution was given by Willebrord Snellius (see Snellius–Pothenot problem).

For the type of precision work involved in surveying, the unmapped point is located by measuring the angles subtended by lines of sight from it to a minimum of three mapped (coordinated) points. In geodetic operations the observations are adjusted for spherical excess and projection variations. Precise angular measurements between lines from the point under location using theodolites provides more accurate results, with trig beacons erected on high points and hills to enable quick and unambiguous sights to known points.

When planning to perform a resection, the surveyor must first plot the locations of the known points along with the approximate unknown point of observation. If all points, including the unknown point, lie close to a circle that can be placed on all four points, then there is no solution or the high risk of an erroneous solution. This is known as observing on the "danger circle". The poor solution stems from the property of a chord subtending equal angles to any other point on the circle.

=== Vs. free stationing ===
- Angular resection and triangulation: only bearings are measured to the known points.
- Trilateration: only distances are measured to the known points.
- Free stationing and triangulateration: both bearings and distances are measured to the known points.

== See also ==
- Hand compass
- Hansen's problem
- Intersection (aeronautics)
- Orienteering
- Orienteering compass
- Position line
- Real time locating
- Solving triangles
- True-range trilateration
