= Gotha Observatory =

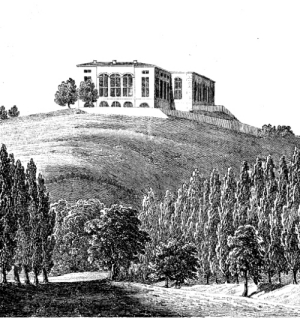
- Seeberg Observatory
- Observatory code: 279
- Location: Gotha, Germany
- Coordinates: 50°56′0″N 10°45′0″E
- Established: After 1787
- Closed: 1934
- Related media on Commons

Gotha Observatory (Seeberg Observatory, Sternwarte Gotha or Seeberg-Sternwarte) was a German astronomical observatory located on Seeberg hill near Gotha, Thuringia, Germany. Initially the observatory was dedicated to astrometry, geodetic and meteorological observation and tracking the time.

The minor planet 1346 Gotha was named after the city of Gotha in recognition of the observatory.

== History ==
Planning for the observatory was begun in 1787 by the court astronomer Baron Franz Xaver von Zach, with the financing of Ernest II, Duke of Saxe-Gotha-Altenburg. It was based upon the Radcliffe Observatory in Oxford, England. The building was divided into five parts, with the central section holding a revolving dome. There were two wings to provide quarters for the staff.

During Peter Andreas Hansen's term, the observatory was dismantled and moved to a less exposed location in Gotha. The observatory was closed in 1934.

== Instruments ==
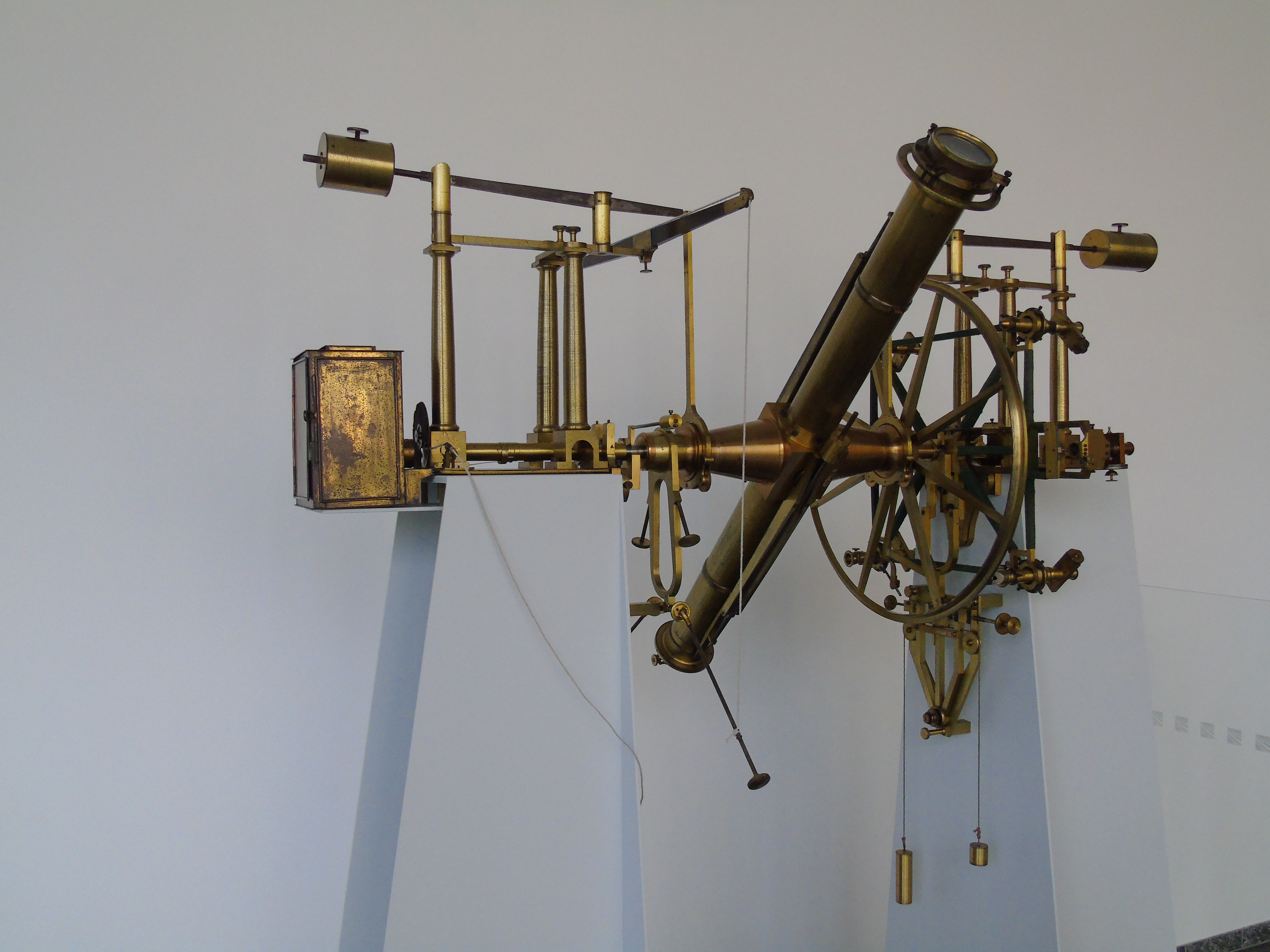
Meridian Circle, at Gotha Observatory till 1936

Around 1800, the observatory became an international center for astronomy, being the most modern astronomical institute primarily for its instruments. The instruments came from London, England, the standard place to acquire them in the 18th century. These included an eighteen-inch quadrant, a two-foot transit instrument, three Hadley sextants, an achromatic heliometer, a two-foot achromatic refractor, a Gregorian reflector and many clocks.

By the start of the nineteenth century improved instrumentation was acquired from Munich, the standard place to acquire them in the 19th century: consisting of a theodolite (Reichenbach, Utzschneider & Liebherr), a different heliometer (Fraunhofer), new mounting, and three-foot meridian circle (Ertel, Utzschneider & Fraunhofer). No spectroscopy or photography was performed at the observatory and the only astrophysical equipment of the observatory was a Zöllner photometer.

== Directors ==
The observatory directors were as follows:

- Franz Xaver von Zach, 1787–1802
- Bernhard von Lindenau, 1802 - ?
- Johann Franz Encke, 1822–1825
- Peter Andreas Hansen 1825 - 1876
- Karl Nikolaus Adalbert Krueger 1876 for four years
- Hugo von Seeliger, 1881

== See also ==
- List of astronomical observatories
