= Tienstra formula =

The Tienstra formula is used to solve the resection problem in surveying, by which the location of a given point is determined by observations of angles to known landmarks from the unknown point.

== Author ==
J. M. Tienstra (1895-1951) was a professor of the Delft university of Technology where he taught the use of barycentric coordinates in solving the resection problem. It seems most probable that his name became attached to the procedure for this reason, though when, and by whom, the formula was first proposed is unknown.

== Method ==
The resection problem consists in finding the location of an observer by measuring the angles subtended by lines of sight from the observer to three known points. Tienstra’s formula provides the most compact and elegant solution to this problem.

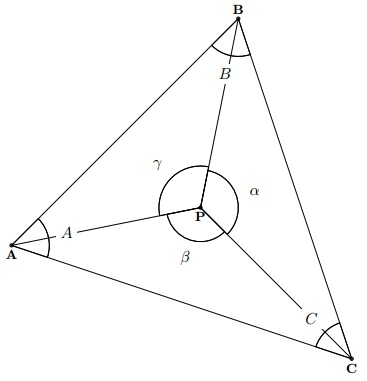
P - unknown point. A, B, C - known points

$$E_p = \frac{K_1 E_a+K_2 E_b+K_3 E_c}{K_1+K_2+K_3}$$

$$N_p = \frac{K_1 N_a+K_2 N_b+K_3 N_c}{K_1+K_2+K_3}$$

Where:

$K_1 = \frac{1}{\cot(A)-\cot(\alpha)}$
$K_2 = \frac{1}{\cot(B)-\cot(\beta)}$
$$K_3 = \frac{1}{\cot(C)-\cot(\gamma)}$$
