= Willebrord Snellius =

Dutch astronomer and mathematician (1580–1626)

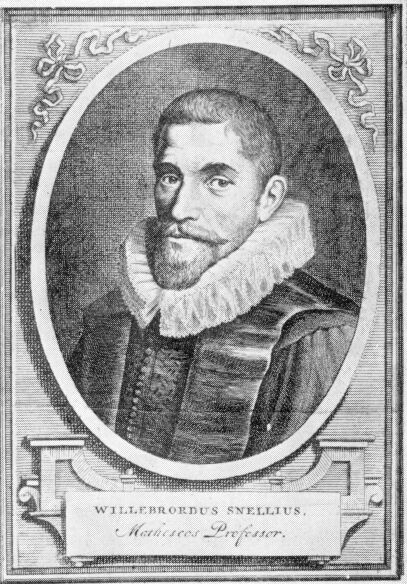
- Willebrord Snel van Royen (1580–1626)
- Born: 13 June 1580; Leiden, Dutch Republic
- Died: 30 October 1626 (aged 46); Leiden, Dutch Republic
- Education: University of Leiden
- Known for: Snell's law, Snellius's triangulation, Snellius–Pothenot problem
- Father: Rudolph Snellius
- Scientific career
- Fields: Astronomy, mathematics
- Workplaces: University of Leiden
- Academic advisors: Ludolph van Ceulen
- Notable students: Jacobus Golius

Willebrord Snellius (born Willebrord Snel van Royen, also Willebrord van Roijen Snel (13 June 1580 – 30 October 1626), commonly known simply as Snellius and Snel, was a Dutch astronomer and mathematician.

Snel is best known for discovering the law of refraction of light, now known as Snell's law, his pioneering work in survey known as Snellius's triangulation, and the Snellius–Pothenot problem, a means in planar trigonometry of finding an unknown point from known ones.

Despite being commonly attributed to Snel, the law of refraction was first discovered by the Persian scientist Ibn Sahl around 984 AD.

== Early life ==
Willebrord Snellius was born Willebrord Snel van Royen on 13 June 1580 in Leiden, in the Dutch Republic. He was the eldest of three children of the mathematician Rudolph Snel van Royen, a professor of mathematics at the University of Leiden. His mother, Machteld Cornelisdochter, came from a leading family in Oudewater. He was named after his paternal grandfather.

He had two younger brothers, Jacob and Hendrik, who both died before adulthood.

Snellius is recorded under several forms of his name. His family name appears as "Snel" or "Snel van Royen", while the Latinized form "Willebrordus Snellius" was used in his publications.

He received his early education at a school run by his father and was introduced to mathematics at a young age. Although his father initially intended him to study law, he developed a stronger interest in mathematics.

He studied at the University of Leiden, where he was influenced by the mathematician Ludolph van Ceulen. He also travelled through several European countries before returning to Leiden.

After his father's death in 1613, Snellius succeeded him as professor of mathematics at the University of Leiden.

== Surveying ==
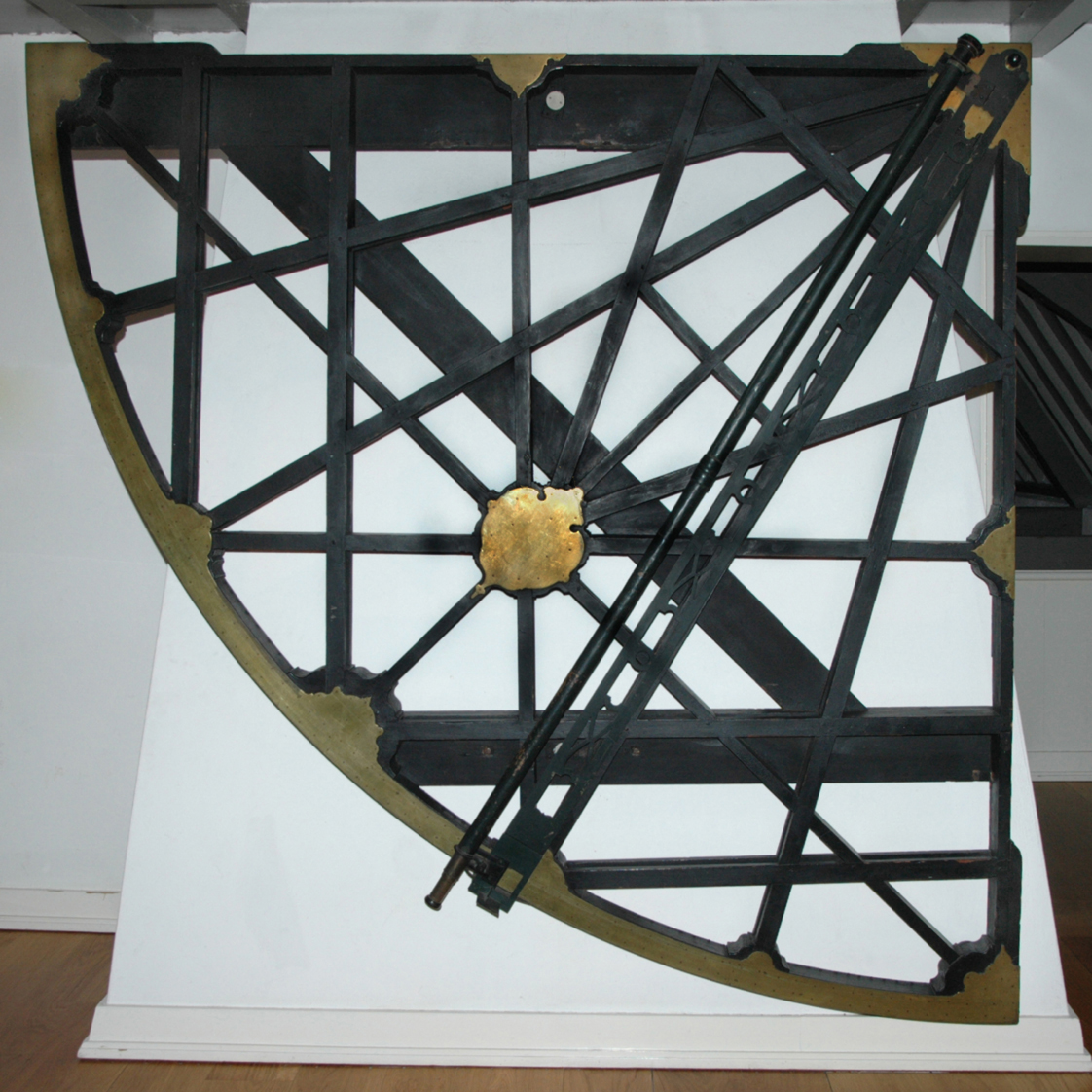
Quadrant of Snellius, Museum Boerhaave, Leiden

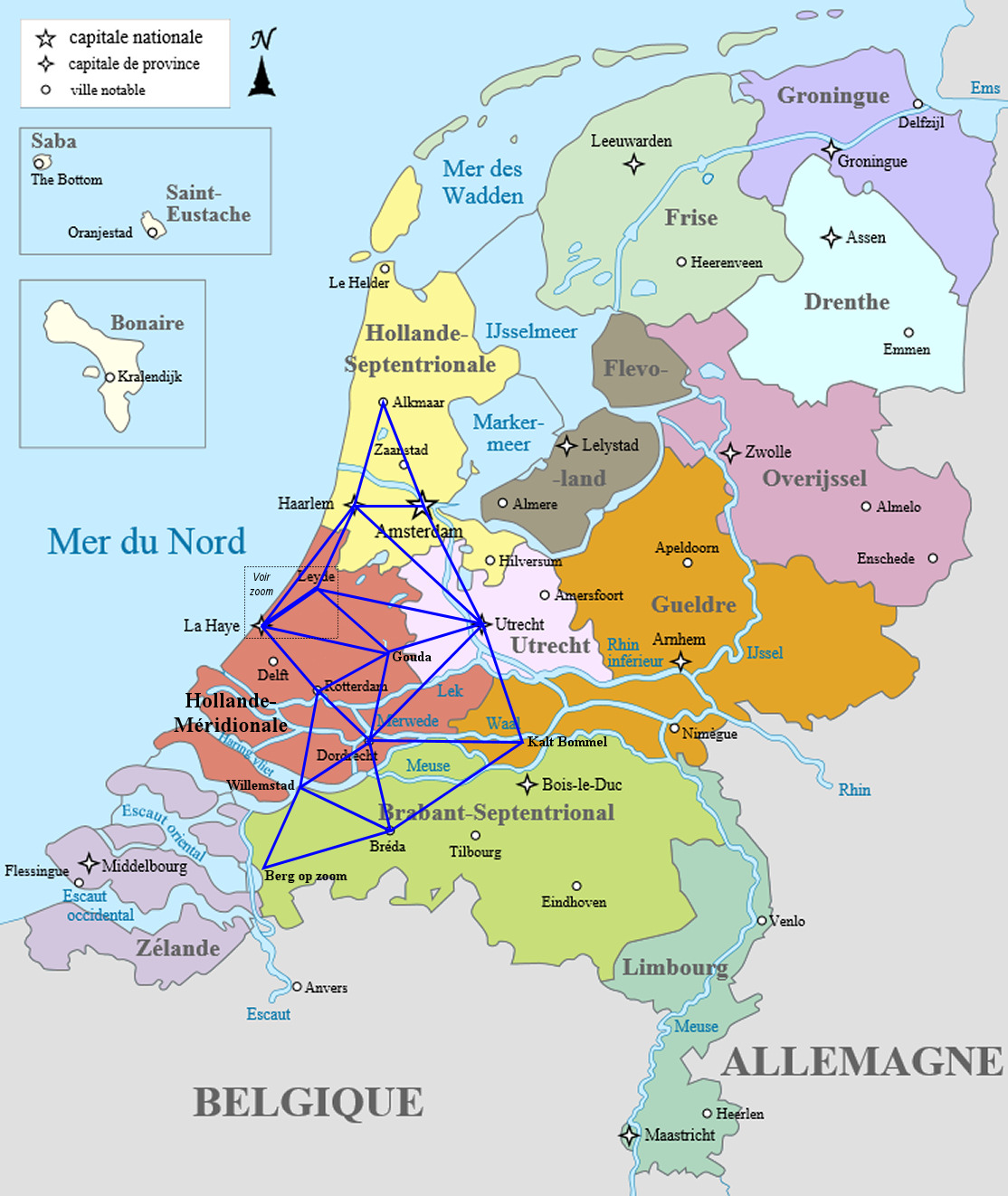
Snellius's Triangulation (1615)

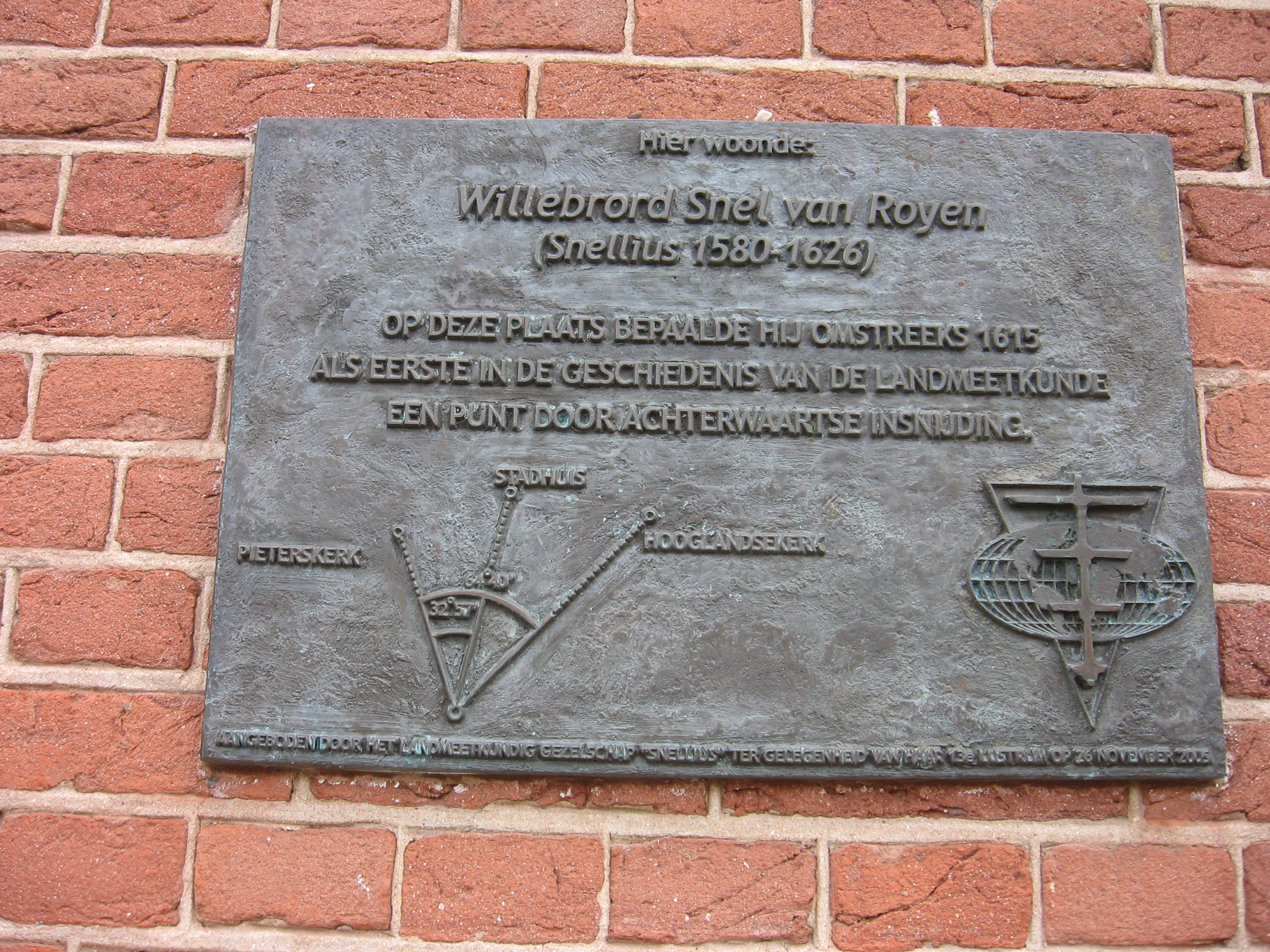
Commemorative plaque on Snellius's house in Leiden

In 1615, Snellius, became the first known surveyor since Eratosthenes in 3rd century BC Ptolemaic Egypt to use triangulation to make a large-scale arc measurement to determine the Earth's circumference.

In his work The terrae Ambitus vera quantitate (1617) under the author's name ("The Dutch Eratosthenes"), Snellius describes achieving his result by calculating the distances between a number of high points in the plain west and southwest of the Netherlands using triangulation. By necessity Snellius's high points were nearly all church spires, virtually the only tall buildings at that time in the west of the Netherlands. More or less ordered from north to south and/or in successive order of measuring, Snellius used a network of fourteen measure points to make a total of 53 triangulation measurements.

These cities were: Alkmaar: St. Laurenskerk; Haarlem: Sint-Bavokerk; Leiden: a then new part (built in 1599) of the city walls; The Hague: Sint-Jacobskerk; Amsterdam: Oude Kerk; Utrecht: Cathedral of Utrecht; Zaltbommel: Sint-Maartenskerk; Gouda: Sint Janskerk; Oudewater: Sint-Michaelskerk; Rotterdam: Sint-Laurenskerk; Dordrecht: Grote Kerk; Willemstad: Koepelkerk; Bergen-op-Zoom: Gertrudiskerk; Breda: Grote Kerk.

Snellius was helped in measuring by two of his students, the Austrian barons Erasmus and Casparus Sterrenberg. In several cities he also received support of friends among the civic leaders (regenten).

In order to carry out these measurements accurately Snellius had a large quadrant built, with which he could accurately measure angles in tenths of degrees. This instrument can still be seen in the Museum Boerhaave in Leiden. In his calculations Snellius made use of a solution for what is now called the Snellius–Pothenot problem.

He came up with an estimate of 28,500 Rhineland rods – in modern units 107.37 km for one degree of latitude. 360 times 107.37 then gives a circumference of the Earth of 38,653 km. The actual circumference is 40,075 kilometers, making Snellius' estimate 3.5% low.

== Mathematics and physics ==
Snellius was also a distinguished mathematician, producing a new method for calculating π—the first such improvement since ancient times. He discovered the law of refraction in 1621.

== Other works ==
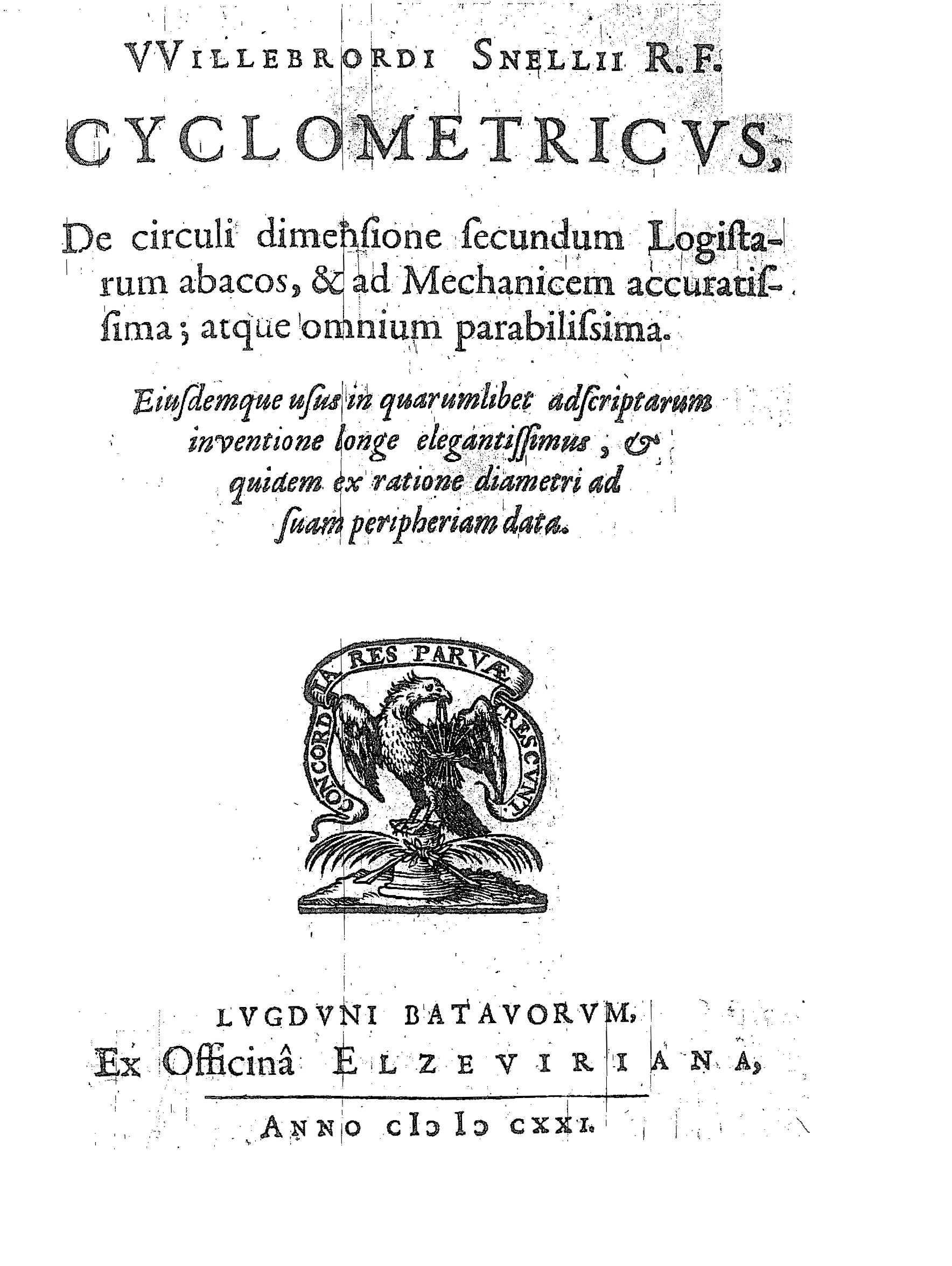
Cyclometricus, 1621

In addition to the Eratosthenes Batavus, he published Cyclometricus, de circuli dimensione (1621), and Tiphys Batavus (1624). He also edited Coeli et siderum in eo errantium observationes Hassiacae (1618), containing the astronomical observations of Landgrave William IV of Hesse. A work on trigonometry (Doctrina triangulorum) authored by Snellius was published a year after his death.

== Death ==
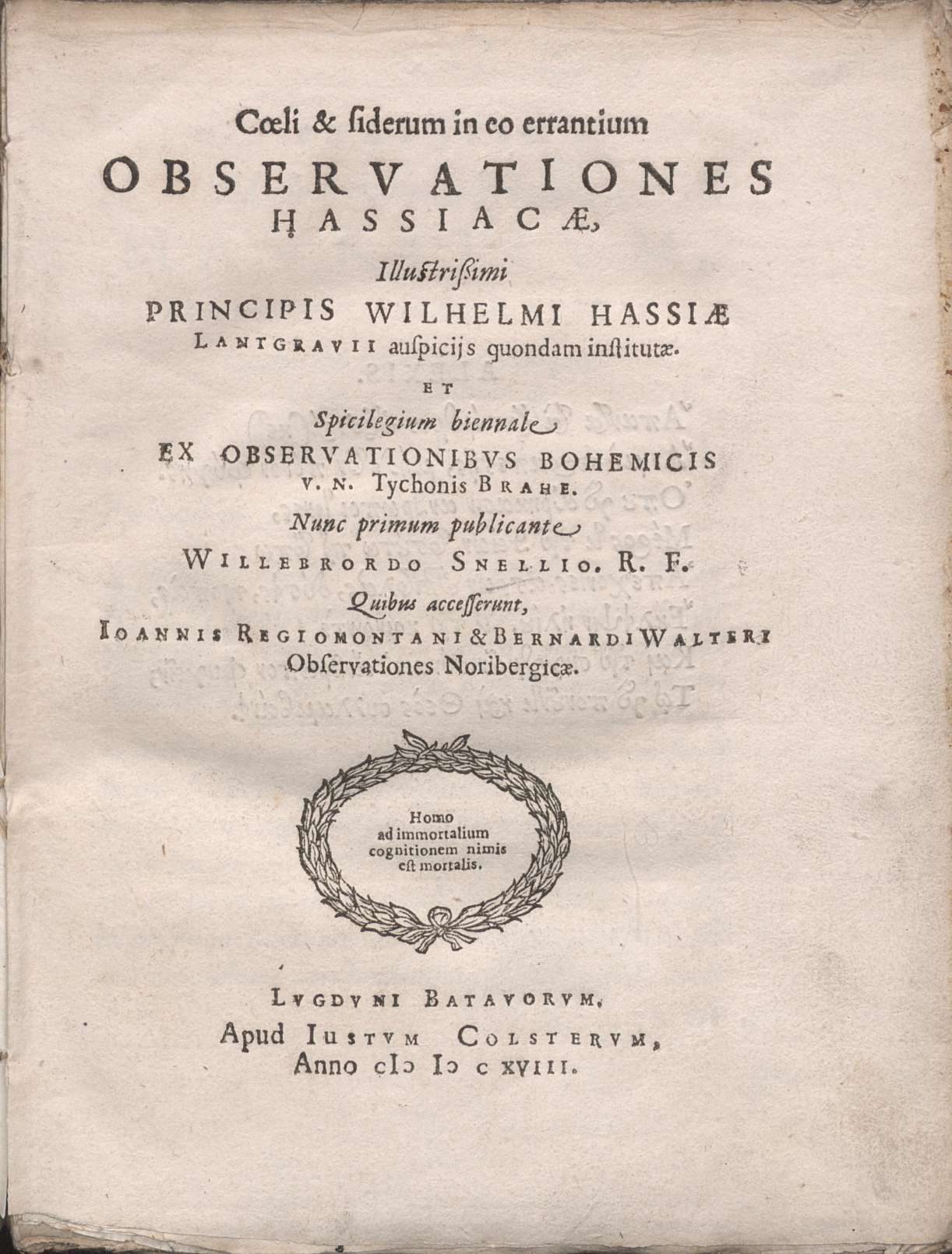
Coeli et siderum in eo errantium observationes Hassicae, 1618

Snellius died in Leiden on 30 October 1626, aged 46, from an illness diagnosed as colic. He was buried in the Pieterskerk, Leiden.

== Legacy ==
Snellius Glacier in Antarctica is named after Willebrord Snellius.

The lunar crater Snellius is named after Willebrord Snellius.

The Royal Netherlands Navy has named three survey ships after Snellius, including a currently-serving vessel.

On September 16th, 2021, the Snellius supercomputer was officially opened by Queen Máxima of the Netherlands at the Amsterdam Data Tower. It is owned and managed by SURFnet.

== Works ==
- Eratosthenes Batavus (in Latin). Lugduni Batavorum: Joost van Colster, Joris Abrahamsz van der Marsce. 1617.
- Coeli et siderum in eo errantium observationes Hassicae (in Latin). Lugduni Batauorum: Joost van Colster. 1618.
- Cyclometricus (in Latin). Lugduni Batavorum: Matthijs Elzevier, Bonaventura Elzevier. 1621.
- Doctrinae triangulorum canonicae libri quatuor (in Latin). Lugduni Batavorum: Joannes Maire. 1627.

== See also ==
- Area of a circle – Concept in geometry
