= Triangulation (surveying) =

Using measures of converging rays to improve fixed points for mapping

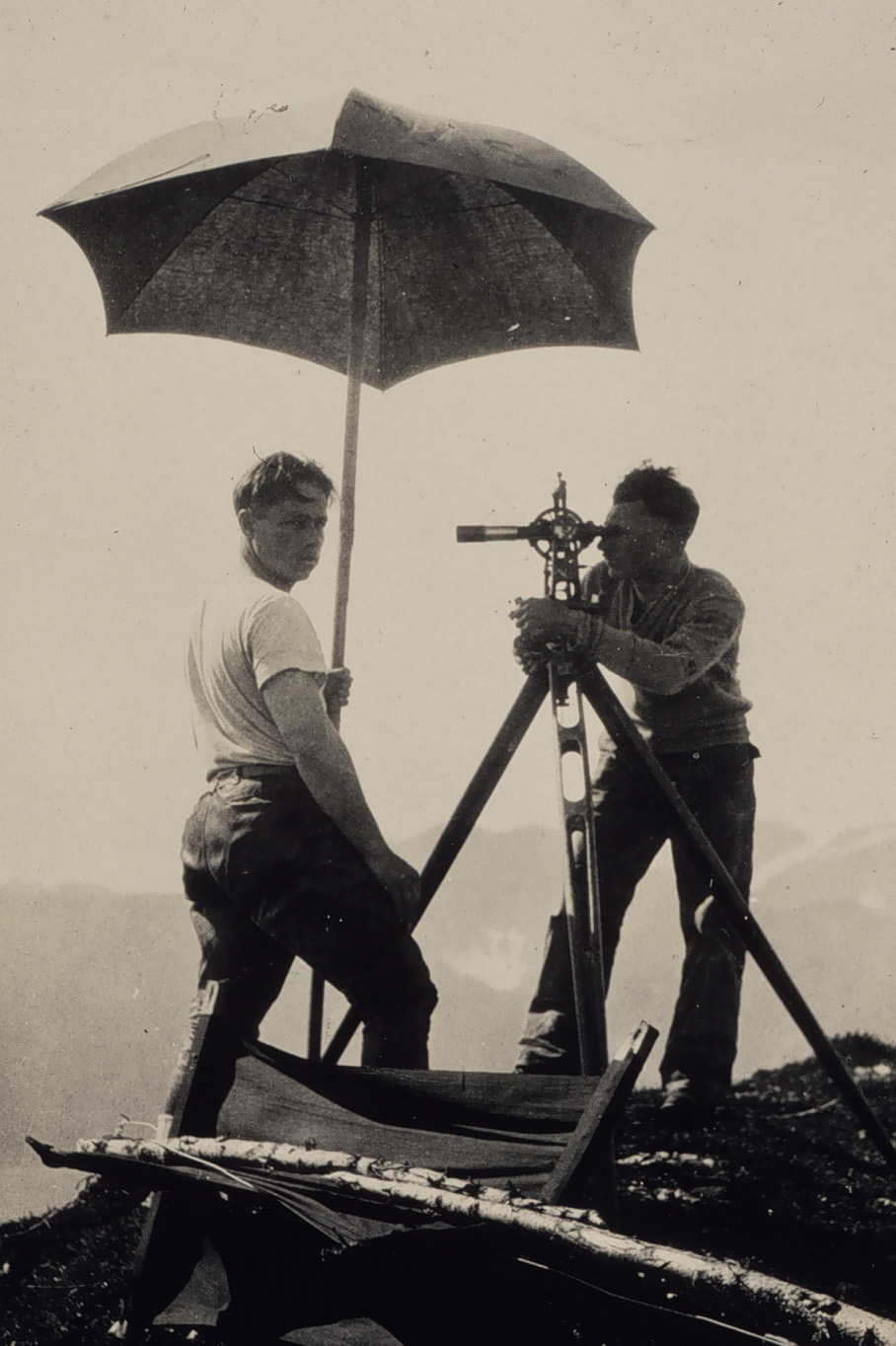
Triangulation of Kodiak Island in Alaska in 1929.

In surveying, triangulation is the process of determining the location of a point by measuring only angles to it from known points at either end of a fixed baseline by using trigonometry, rather than measuring distances to the point directly as in trilateration. The point can then be fixed as the third point of a triangle with one known side and two known angles.

Triangulation can also refer to the accurate surveying of systems of very large triangles, called triangulation networks. This followed from the work of Willebrord Snell in 1615–17, who showed how a point could be located from the angles subtended from three known points, but measured at the new unknown point rather than the previously fixed points, a problem called resectioning. Surveying error is minimized if a mesh of triangles at the largest appropriate scale is established first. Points inside the triangles can all then be accurately located with reference to it. Such triangulation methods were used for accurate large-scale land surveying until the rise of global navigation satellite systems in the 1980s.

== Principle ==
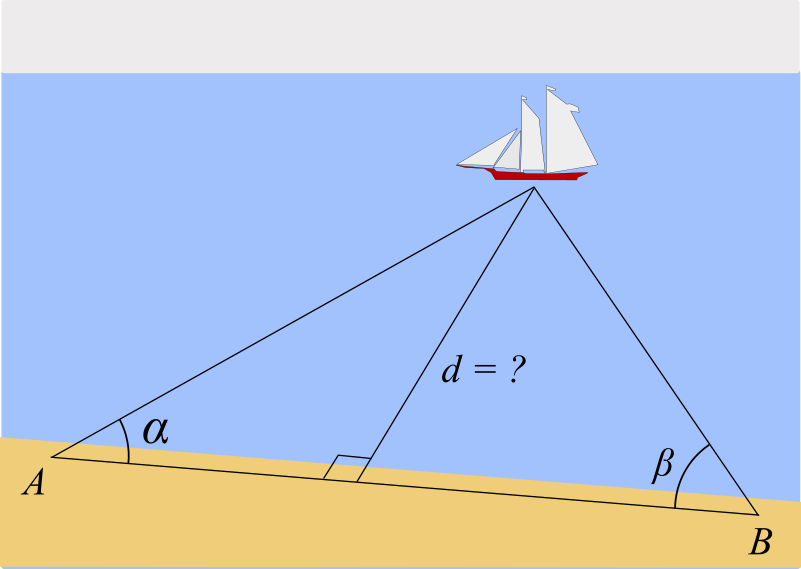

Triangulation may be used to find the position of the ship when the positions of A and B are known. An observer at A measures the angle α, while the observer at B measures β.

The position of any vertex of a triangle can be calculated if the length of one side, and two angles, are known. The following formulae are strictly correct only for a flat surface. If the curvature of the Earth must be allowed for, then spherical trigonometry must be used.

=== Calculation ===
With $\ell$ being the distance between A and B gives:

$$\ell = \frac{d}{\tan \alpha} + \frac{d}{\tan \beta}$$

Using the trigonometric identities:

tan α = sin α / cos α

and

sin(α + β) = sin α cos β + cos α sin β,

this is equivalent to:

$$\ell= d \left(\frac{\cos \alpha}{\sin \alpha} + \frac{\cos \beta}{\sin \beta}\right)$$

$$\ell = d\ \frac{ \sin(\alpha + \beta)}{\sin\alpha \sin\beta }$$

therefore:

$$d = \ell\ \frac{ \sin\alpha \sin\beta }{ \sin(\alpha + \beta)}$$

From this, it is easy to determine the distance of the unknown point from either observation point, its north/south and east/west offsets from the observation point, and finally its full coordinates.

== History ==
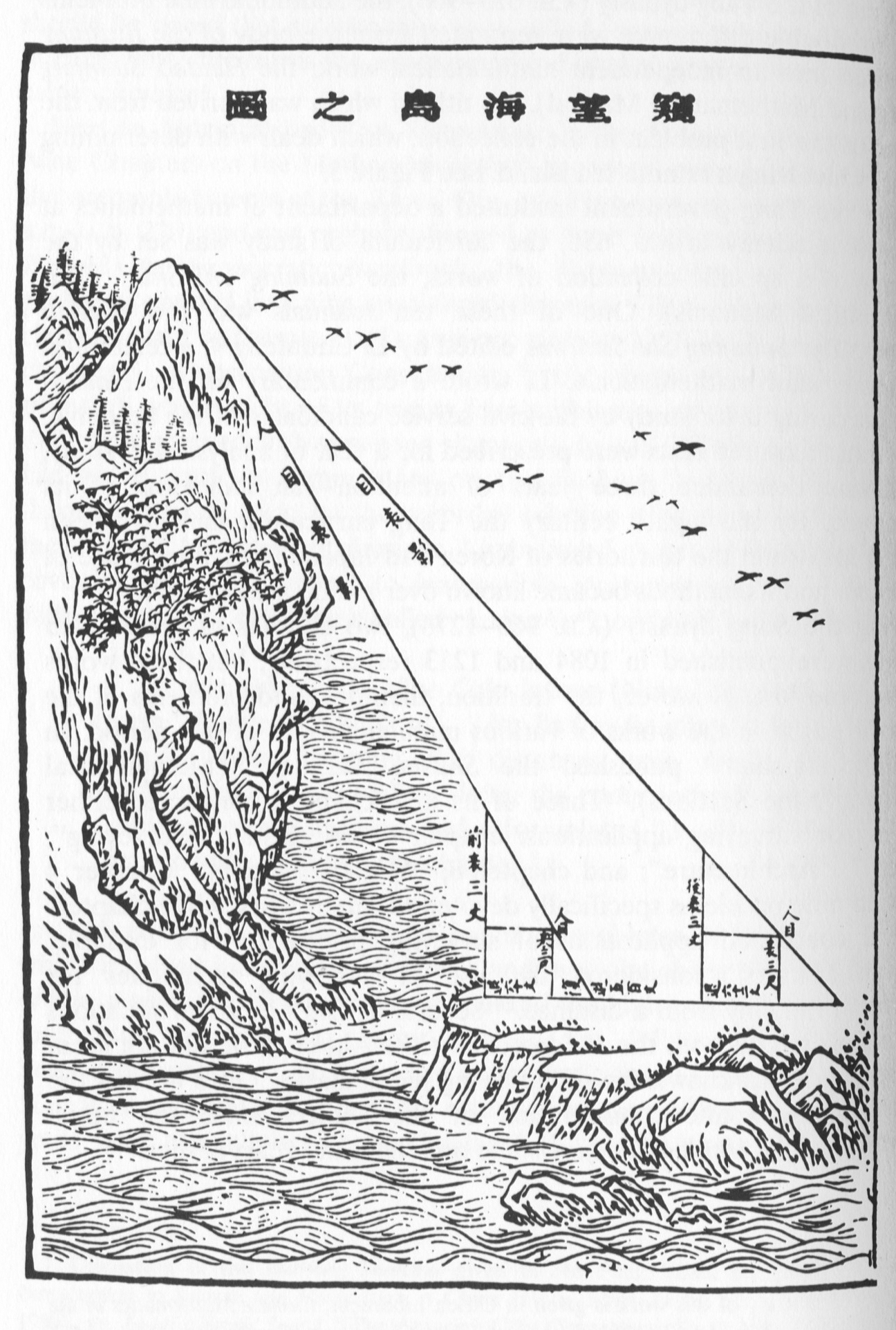
Liu Hui (c. 263), How to measure the height of a sea island. Illustration from an edition of 1726

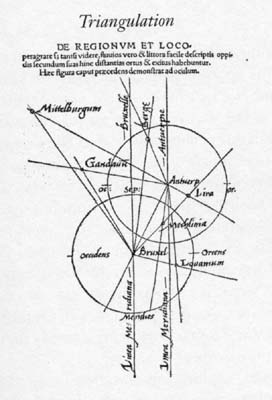
Gemma Frisius's 1533 proposal to use triangulation for mapmaking

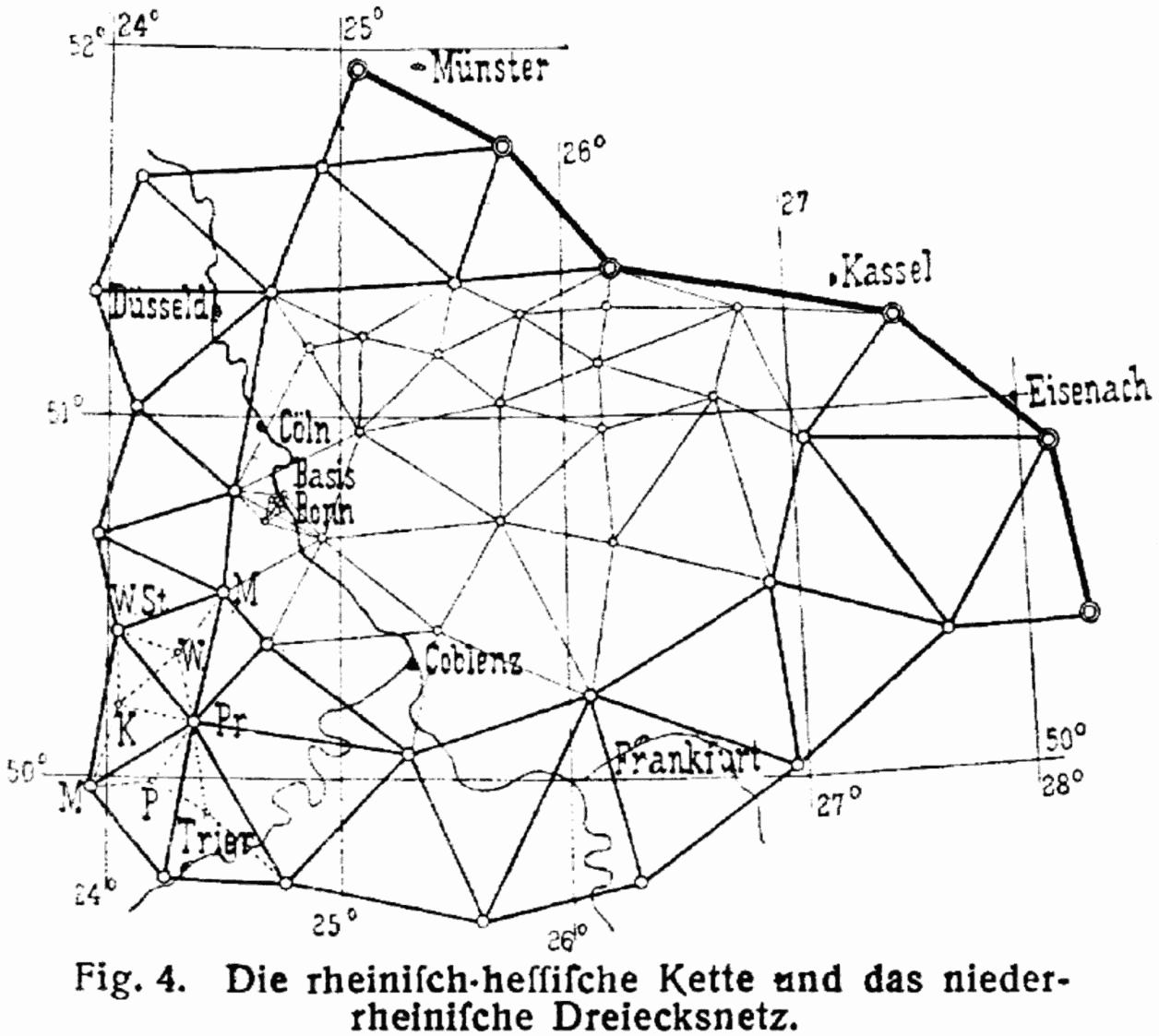
Nineteenth-century triangulation network for the triangulation of Rhineland-Hesse

Triangulation today is used for many purposes, including surveying, navigation, metrology, astrometry, binocular vision, model rocketry and gun direction of weapons.

In the field, triangulation methods were apparently not used by the Roman specialist land surveyors, the agrimensores; but were introduced into medieval Spain through Arabic treatises on the astrolabe, such as that by Ibn al-Saffar (d. 1035). Abu Rayhan Biruni (d. 1048) also introduced triangulation techniques to measure the size of the Earth and the distances between various places. Simplified Roman techniques then seem to have co-existed with more sophisticated techniques used by professional surveyors. But it was rare for such methods to be translated into Latin (a manual on geometry, the eleventh century Geomatria incerti auctoris is a rare exception), and such techniques appear to have percolated only slowly into the rest of Europe. Increased awareness and use of such techniques in Spain may be attested by the medieval Jacob's staff, used specifically for measuring angles, which dates from about 1300; and the appearance of accurately surveyed coastlines in the Portolan charts, the earliest of which that survives is dated 1296.

=== Gemma Frisius ===
On land, the cartographer Gemma Frisius proposed using triangulation to accurately position far-away places for map-making in his 1533 pamphlet Libellus de Locorum describendorum ratione (Booklet concerning a way of describing places), which he bound in as an appendix in a new edition of Peter Apian's best-selling 1524 Cosmographica. This became very influential, and the technique spread across Germany, Austria and the Netherlands. The astronomer Tycho Brahe applied the method in Scandinavia, completing a detailed triangulation in 1579 of the island of Hven, where his observatory was based, with reference to key landmarks on both sides of the Øresund, producing an estate plan of the island in 1584. In England Frisius's method was included in the growing number of books on surveying which appeared from the middle of the century onwards, including William Cuningham's Cosmographical Glasse (1559), Valentine Leigh's Treatise of Measuring All Kinds of Lands (1562), William Bourne's Rules of Navigation (1571), Thomas Digges's Geometrical Practise named Pantometria (1571), and John Norden's Surveyor's Dialogue (1607). It has been suggested that Christopher Saxton may have used rough-and-ready triangulation to place features in his county maps of the 1570s; but others suppose that, having obtained rough bearings to features from key vantage points, he may have estimated the distances to them simply by guesswork.

=== Willebrord Snell ===
The modern systematic use of triangulation networks stems from the work of the Dutch mathematician Willebrord Snell, who in 1615 surveyed the distance from Alkmaar to Breda, approximately 72 miles (116 kilometres), using a chain of quadrangles containing 33 triangles in all. Snell underestimated the distance by 3.5%. The two towns were separated by one degree on the meridian, so from his measurement he was able to calculate a value for the circumference of the earth – a feat celebrated in the title of his book Eratosthenes Batavus (The Dutch Eratosthenes), published in 1617. Snell calculated how the planar formulae could be corrected to allow for the curvature of the earth. He also showed how to resection, or calculate, the position of a point inside a triangle using the angles cast between the vertices at the unknown point. These could be measured much more accurately than bearings of the vertices, which depended on a compass. This established the key idea of surveying a large-scale primary network of control points first, and then locating secondary subsidiary points later, within that primary network.

=== Further developments ===
Snell's methods were taken up by Jean Picard who in 1669–70 surveyed one degree of latitude along the Paris Meridian using a chain of thirteen triangles stretching north from Paris to the clocktower of Sourdon, near Amiens. Thanks to improvements in instruments and accuracy, Picard's is rated as the first reasonably accurate measurement of the radius of the earth. Over the next century this work was extended most notably by the Cassini family: between 1683 and 1718 Jean-Dominique Cassini and his son Jacques Cassini surveyed the whole of the Paris meridian from Dunkirk to Perpignan; and between 1733 and 1740 Jacques and his son César Cassini undertook the first triangulation of the whole country, including a re-surveying of the meridian arc, leading to the publication in 1745 of the first map of France constructed on rigorous principles.

Triangulation methods were by now well established for local mapmaking, but it was only towards the end of the 18th century that other countries began to establish detailed triangulation network surveys to map whole countries. The Principal Triangulation of Great Britain was begun by the Ordnance Survey in 1783, though not completed until 1853; and the Great Trigonometric Survey of India, which ultimately named and mapped Mount Everest and the other Himalayan peaks, was begun in 1801. For the Napoleonic French state, the French triangulation was extended by Jean-Joseph Tranchot into the German Rhineland from 1801, subsequently completed after 1815 by the Prussian general Karl von Müffling. Meanwhile, the mathematician Carl Friedrich Gauss was entrusted from 1821 to 1825 with the triangulation of the kingdom of Hanover (Gaussian land survey), on which he applied the method of least squares to find the best fit solution for problems of large systems of simultaneous equations given more real-world measurements than unknowns.

Today, large-scale triangulation networks for positioning have largely been superseded by the global navigation satellite systems established since the 1980s, but many of the control points for the earlier surveys still survive as valued historical features in the landscape, such as the concrete triangulation pillars set up for retriangulation of Great Britain (1936–1962), or the triangulation points set up for the Struve Geodetic Arc (1816–1855), now scheduled as a UNESCO World Heritage Site.

== See also ==
- Anglo-French Survey (1784–1790)
- Bilby tower
- Great Trigonometrical Survey
- Multilateration, where a point is calculated using the time-difference-of-arrival between other known points
- Parallax
- Resection (orientation)
- SOCET SET
- Spherical trigonometry
- Stellar triangulation
- Stereopsis
- Trig point
