= Boggs eumorphic projection =

Pseudocylindrical equal-area map projection

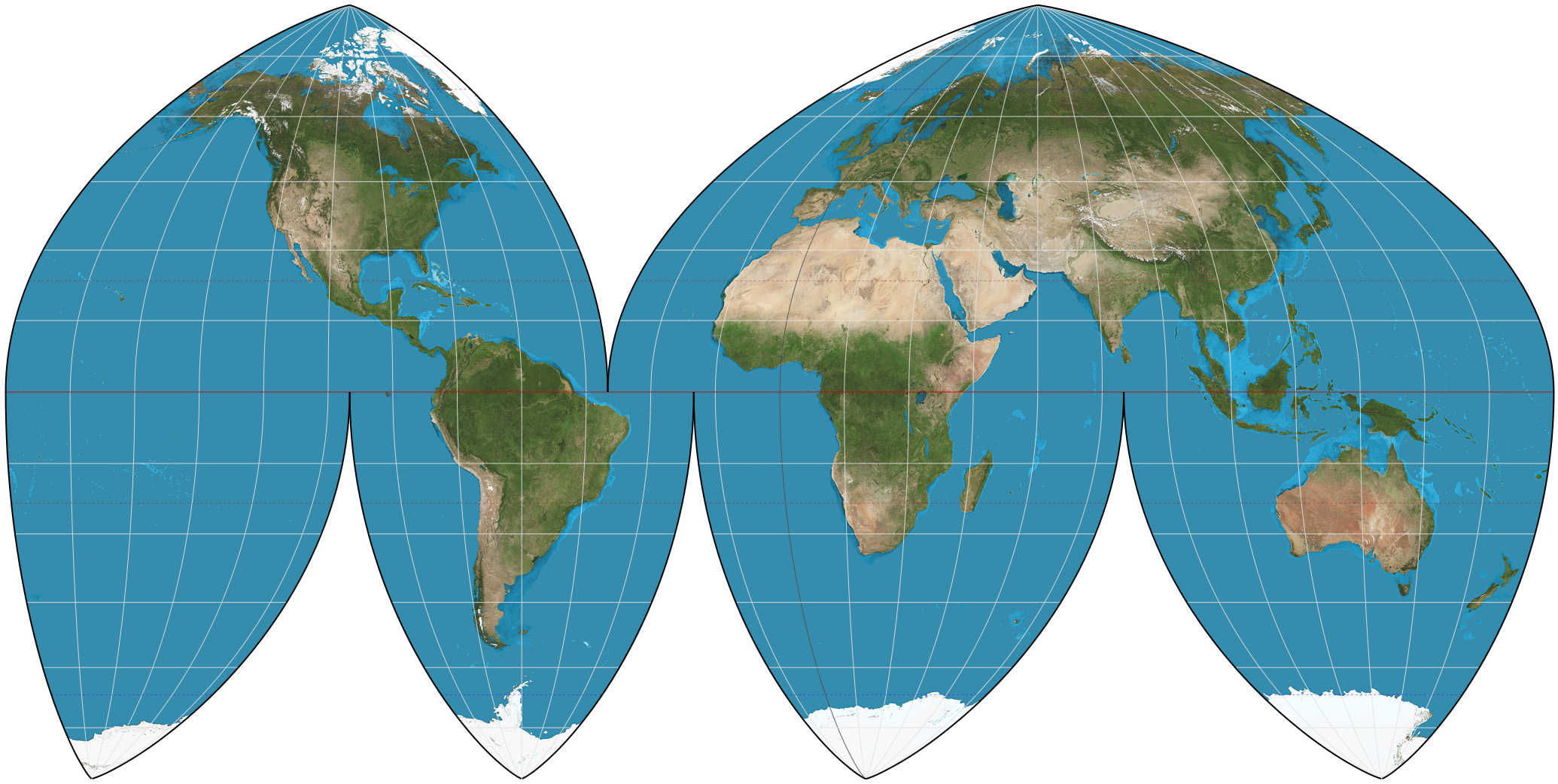
Boggs eumorphic projection of the world.

Tissot indicatrix on Boggs eumorphic projection, 15° graticule, gradations every 10° of angular deformation.

The Boggs eumorphic projection is a pseudocylindrical, equal-area map projection used for world maps. Normally it is presented with multiple interruptions. Its equal-area property makes it useful for presenting spatial distribution of phenomena. The projection was developed in 1929 by Samuel Whittemore Boggs (1889–1954) to provide an alternative to the Mercator projection for portraying global areal relationships. Boggs was geographer for the United States Department of State from 1924 until his death. The Boggs eumorphic projection has been used occasionally in textbooks and atlases.

Boggs generally repeated regions in two different lobes of the interrupted map in order to show Greenland or eastern Russia undivided. He preferred his interrupted version, and named it "eumorphic", meaning "goodly shaped" (in Boggs's own words). The projection's mathematical development was completed by Oscar S. Adams of the United States Coast and Geodetic Survey.

== Formulas ==
The projection averages the y-coordinates of the Mollweide projection and the Sinusoidal projection for a given geographic coordinate in order to obtain its own y-coordinate. The x-coordinate is then forced by the constraints of the equal-area property and the pseudocylindric class.

Given a radius of sphere R, an adjustment k = 1.00138, a central meridian λ_{0} and a point with geographical latitude φ and longitude λ, plane coordinates x and y can be computed using the following formulas:
$$\begin{align} x &= 2Rk \frac{\lambda - \lambda_0}{\sec \varphi + \frac{\pi \sqrt{2}}{4} \sec \theta}, \\
y &= R\frac{\varphi + \sqrt{2} \sin \theta}{2k} \end{align}$$
where
$$2\theta + \sin 2\theta = \pi \sin \varphi$$
θ can be solved for numerically using Newton's method. The adjustment k shifts the points of no distortion to 40°N/S at each lobe's central meridian.

== See also ==
- List of map projections
- Goode homolosine projection
