= Interruption (map projection) =

Places where the globe has been split in a map projection

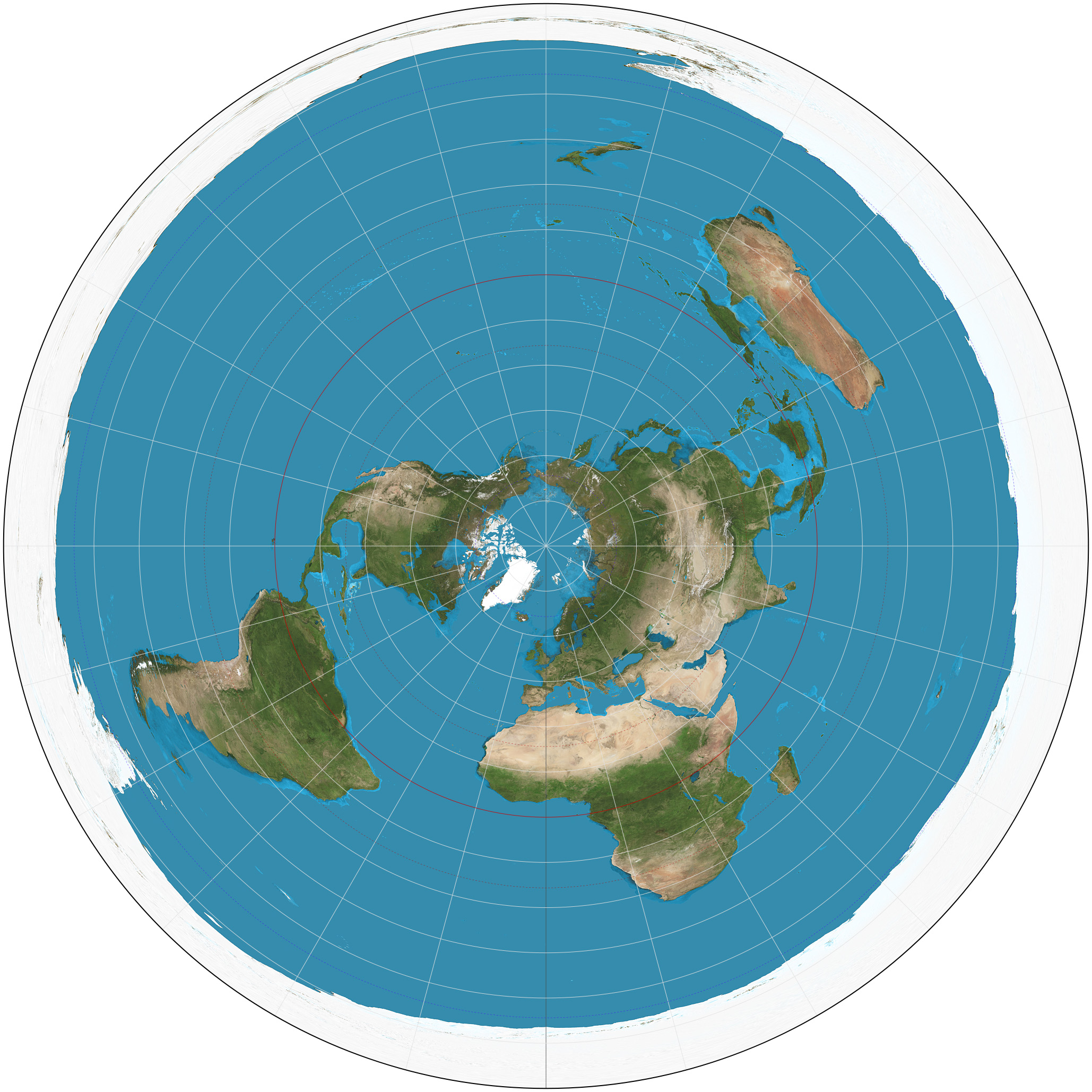
An azimuthal projection showing the minimal interruption possible: one point, which, in this case, is the south pole that has turned into a ring around the entire map.

In map projections, an interruption is any place where the globe has been split. All map projections are interrupted at at least one point. Typical world maps are interrupted along an entire meridian. In that typical case, the interruption forms an east–west boundary, even though the globe has no boundaries.

Most map projections can be interrupted beyond what is required by the projection mathematics. The reason for doing so is to improve distortion within the map by sacrificing proximity—that is, by separating places that are adjacent on the globe. Effectively, this means that the resulting map is actually an amalgam of several partial map projections of smaller regions. Because the regions are smaller, they cover less of the globe, are closer to flat, and therefore accrue less inevitable distortion. These extra interruptions do not create a new projection. Rather, the result is an "arrangement" of an existing projection.

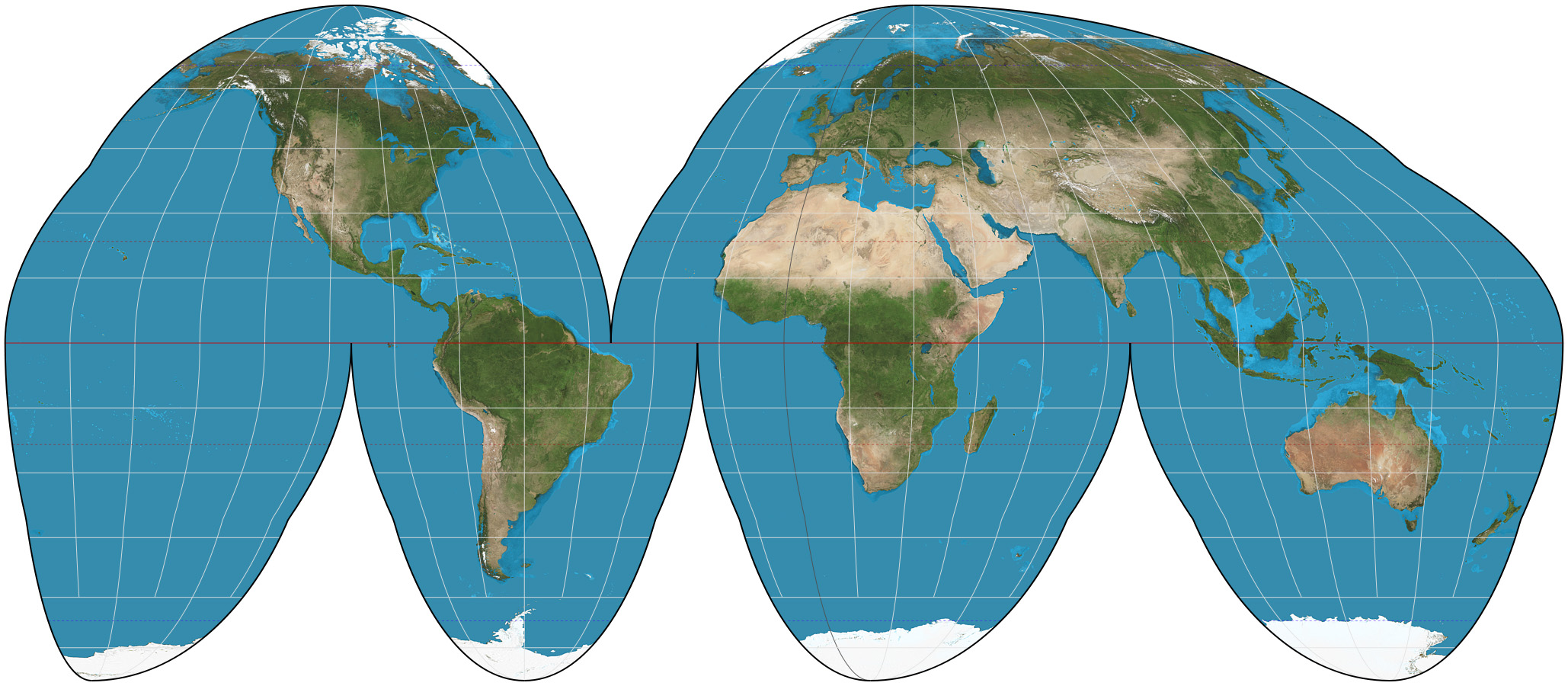
Goode homolosine projection of the world using interruptions to reduce distortion of the continents

In casual parlance, interrupted projection usually means a projection that has been interrupted beyond mathematical necessity. In this casual sense, the usual east/west interruption of a pseudocylindric map is ignored as an interruption to focus on the elective interruptions. An archetypical example is the Goode homolosine projection. In 1916, John Paul Goode experimented by interrupting the Mollweide projection. Satisfied with the interruption scheme, he then devised a new projection as a composite of the Mollweide and the sinusoidal projection and applied the same interruption scheme to the new projection, which he dubbed "homolosine".

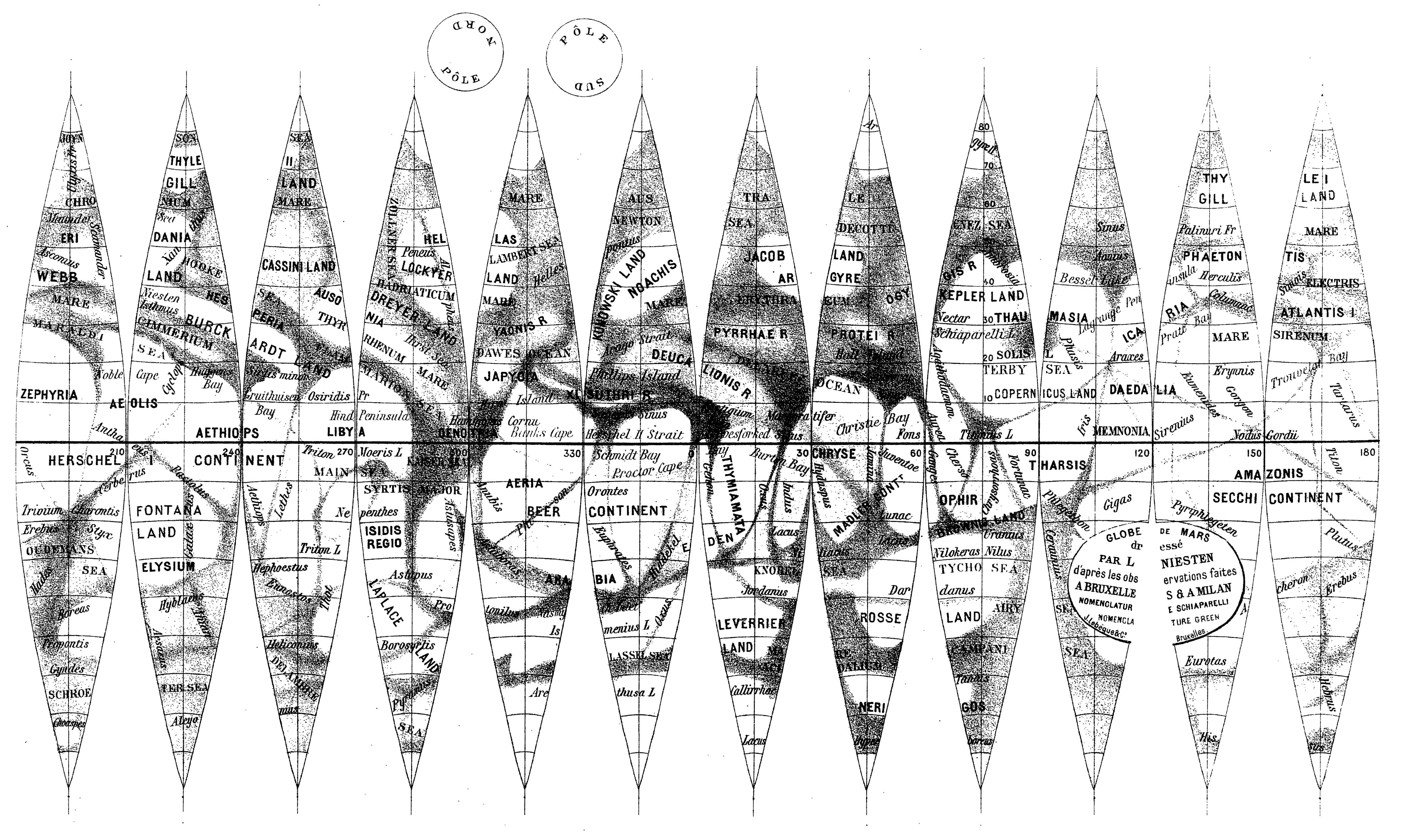
Globe gores, yielding small enough sections to paste onto a globe without splitting the paper or warping it too much

Because pseudocylindric projections map parallels as straight lines, and meridians to have constant spacing, they are easy to interrupt. This is normally done to optimize either for continental areas or for oceanic areas, as explored by Goode.

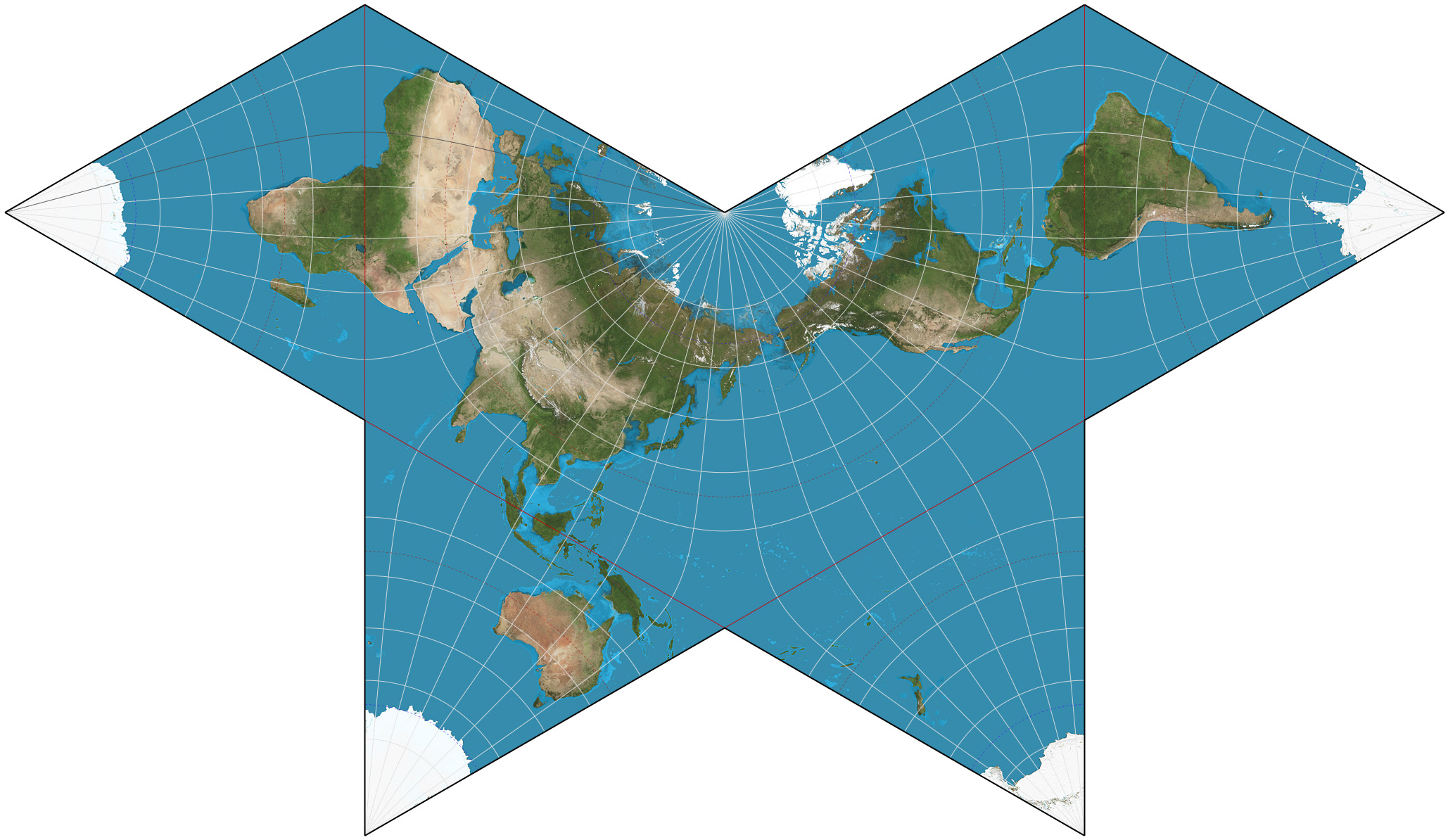
Conformal version (1929) of Cahill's butterfly

Many interruption schemes that are much more elaborate have been developed. Since antiquity, for example, globe gores have been developed in order to paste map sections onto model globes. These are regular interruption either along the equator, or in polar form as "rosettes". The Cahill butterfly projection divides the world into octahedral sections. More generally, any mapping onto polyhedral faces becomes an interrupted map when laid flat. Buckminster Fuller proposed his "dymaxion" map in 1943, using a modified icosahedral interruption scheme to divide the oceans up in a way that shows the continents in a nearly continuous mass as "one island". The most elaborate interruptions schemes include those of Athelstan Spilhaus along continental boundaries, and JJ Wijk's myriahedral projections.

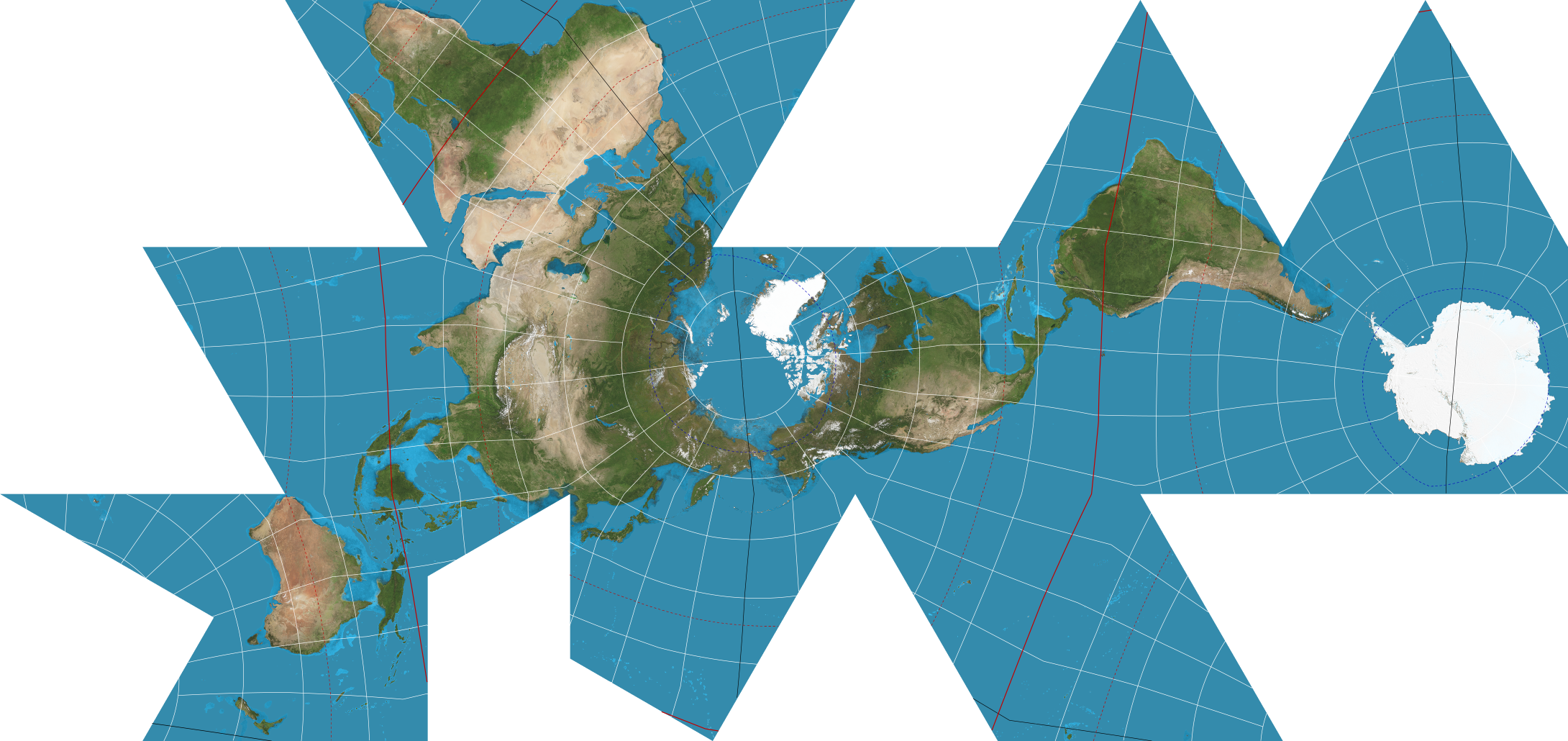
Dymaxion map, a projection onto an icosahedron and then split mostly along the face boundaries.
