= John Paul Goode =

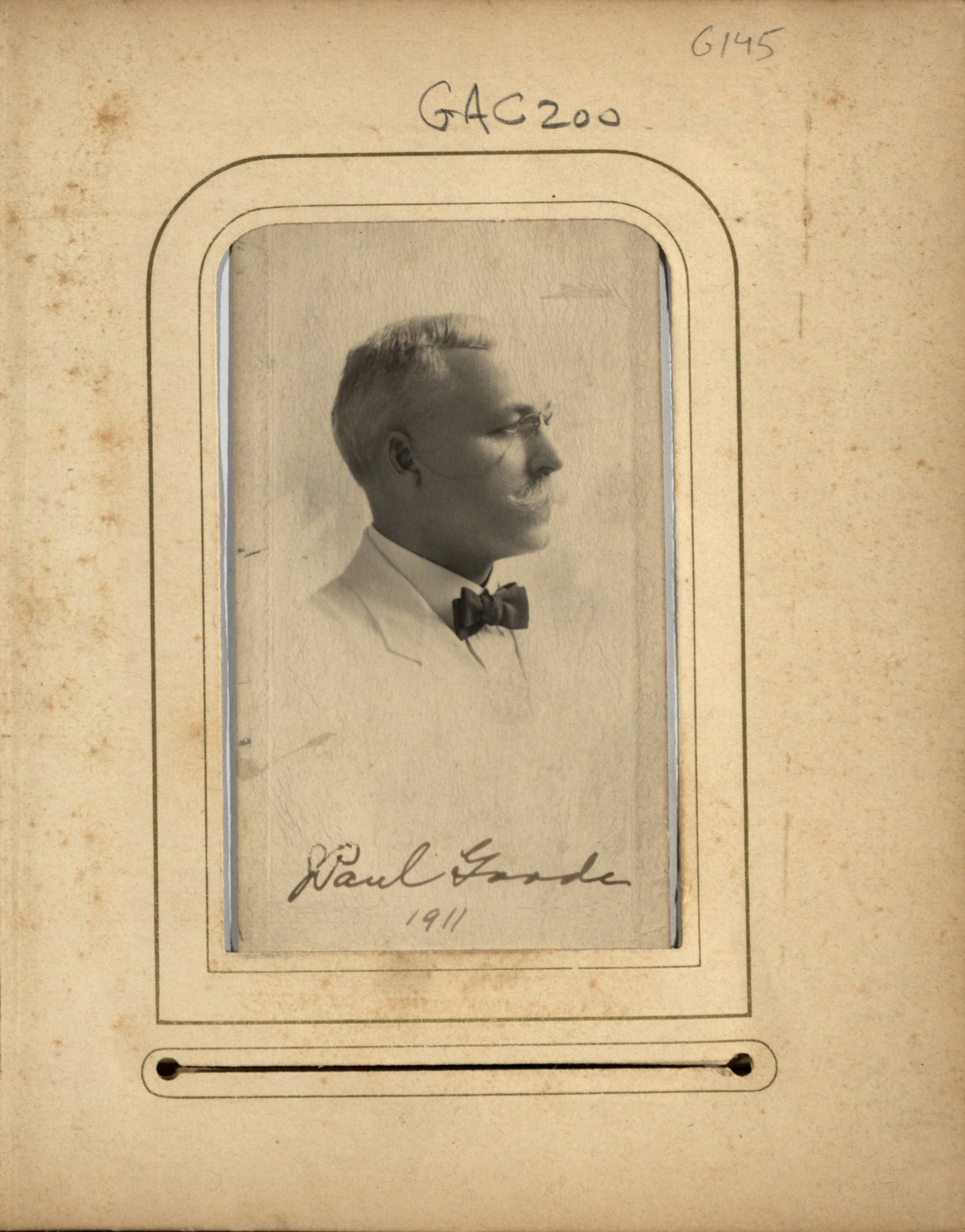
John Paul Goode

John Paul Goode (November 21, 1862 – August 5, 1932), a geographer and cartographer, was one of the key geographers in American geography's Incipient Period from 1900 to 1940 (McMaster and McMaster 306). Goode was born in Stewartville, Minnesota on November 21, 1862. Goode received his bachelor's degree from the University of Minnesota 1889 and his doctorate in economics from the University of Pennsylvania in 1903. Goode got his first teaching job at Moorhead Normal School in 1889 where he taught geology, chemistry, physics, anatomy, botany and physiology. He married Ida Katherine Hancock, a physiology and arithmetic instructor at the school since 1897, in 1901 in Crookston, Minnesota. By late 1901, Goode and Ida moved to Charleston, Illinois as a member of the faculty at Eastern Illinois State Normal School (now Eastern Illinois University), where he taught physics and geography (Eastern Illinois University iv). Later on in 1903, he was offered a position as a professor in the Geography Department at the University of Chicago (Haas and Ward 241, 243).

== Evil Mercator ==
In 1908, Goode spoke at an American Association of Geographers meeting in Baltimore about the creating an alternative to the "Evil Mercator" (Hass and Ward 244). The Mercator projection has severe distortion at the poles and northern latitudes. Goode merged the homolographic and sinusoidal projections at 40° 44′ 11.8″ N and S to make the Goode Interrupted Homolosine projection (Stienwand 1). The "homolo" coming from homolographic, and the "sine" originating from sinusoidal. He calculated the latitude where the two projections had the same scale and therefore should be merged by overlaying the two projections on each other. Above and below 40° 44′ 11.8″ N and S respectively, the homolographic projection is used. Between those two latitudes the sinusoidal projection is inserted. The Interrupted Homolosine projection is a pseudo-cylindrical, equal area projection. Initially, Goode's Homolosine projection did not have universal appeal. The United States not being at the center of the map challenged the cartographic culture of the time (Schulten 187).

== Goode's Atlas ==
Two of Goode's former students (Leppard and Espenshade) helped him create Goode's School Atlas (later retitled Goode's World Atlas), first published in 1923 by Rand McNally. Goode claimed that "[E]very square inch in the map represents the same number of square miles of the earth's surface as any other square inch in the map" (Schulten p187). The atlas is still published today, now in its 23rd edition.

By 1928, under failing health and 66 years old, Goode had a heart attack.

In 1930, seeing that technology had made the political framework of the United States redundant (a framework laid down when it took a courier on horseback one full day to traverse a county), Goode presented a plan for a new 50 state union to replace the then 48 states. 31 of the existing states were to be retained, 17 would be converted to 8 and to these would be added 11 city-states comprising the largest metropolitan areas of the time. (Chase 256).

On August 5, 1932, John Paul Goode died at age 69 (Hass and Ward p. 246).

== Sources ==
- Chase, Stuart., The Economy of Abundance New York, The Macmillan company, 1934: 256
- Eastern Illinois University, "Bulletin - Annual Catalogue of the Third Year (1901-1902)" (1901). Eastern Illinois University Bulletin. 227. https://thekeep.eiu.edu/eiu_bulletin/227
- Haas, William H., Ward Harold B. "J. Paul Goode". Annals of the Association of American Geographers 23.4 (1933): 241–246.
- McMaster, Robert, McMaster Susanna. "A History of Twentieth-Century American Academic Cartography." Cartography and Geographic Information Science 29.3 (2002): 305–321.
- Schulten, Susan. The Geographical Imagination in America, 1880–1950. Chicago & London: The University of Chicago Press, (2001): 187
- Steinwand D. R., Mapping Raster Imagery to the Interrupted Goode Homolosine Projection. USGS Dec. 1, 2003.
