= Cordiform =

Cordiform may refer to

- Cordiform leaf, a type of leaf morphology
- Cordiform projection, a map projection
- Cordiform axe, a type of Lower Paleolithic hand axe
