= Johannes Stabius =

Austrian cartographer and astronomer

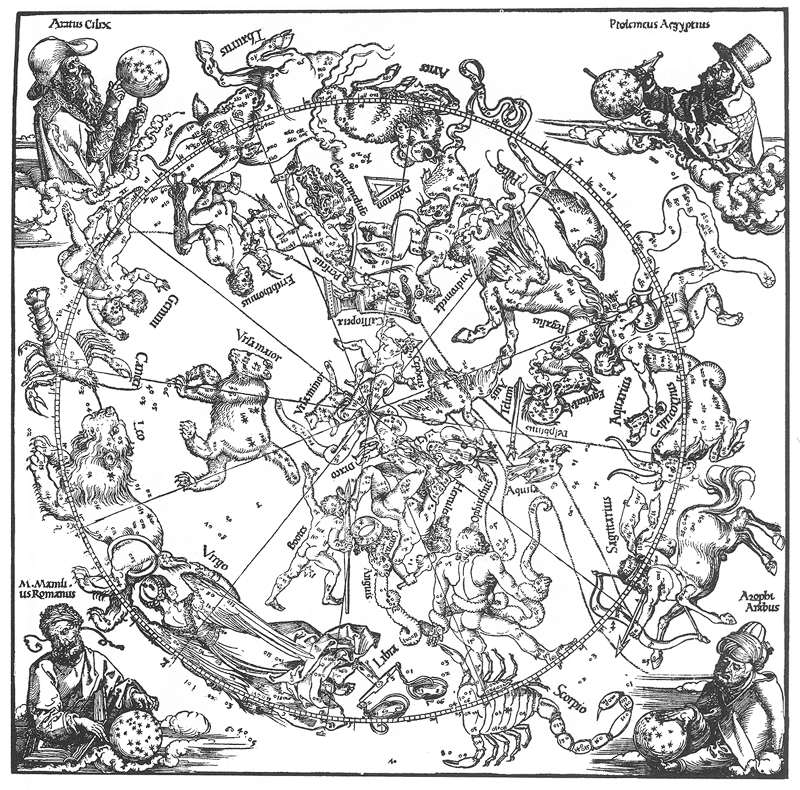
The Northern Hemisphere of the Celestial Globe, created by Albrecht Dürer under the direction of Stabius and Konrad Heinfogel

Johannes Stabius (Johann Stab) (1450–1522) was an Austrian cartographer and astronomer of Vienna who developed, around 1500, the heart-shape (cordiform) projection map later developed further by Johannes Werner. It is called the Werner map projection, but also the Stabius-Werner or the Stab-Werner projection.

After its introduction by Werner in his 1514 book, Nova translatio primi libri geographiaae C. Ptolemaei, the Werner projection was commonly used for world maps and some continental maps through the 16th century and into the 17th century. It was used by Mercator, Oronce Fine, and Ortelius in the late 16th century for maps of Asia and Africa. By the 18th century, it was replaced by the Bonne projection for continental maps. The Werner projection is only used today for instructional purposes and as a novelty.

In 1512, Stabius published a work called the Horoscopion. He also devised a card dial. In 1515 Dürer and Johannes Stabius created the first world map projected on a solid geometric sphere. On an "imaginary orb", they created a perspective view of the surface geography of the world.

In 1515, Stabius (who also acted as the court astronomer), Dürer and the astronomer Konrad Heinfogel produced the first planispheres of both southern and northerns hemispheres, also the first printed celestial maps. These maps prompted the revival of interest in the field of uranometry throughout Europe.

Stabius often acted as Dürer's and Maximilian's go-between for their financial problems.

Stabius was a member of a circle of humanists based in Vienna. This circle included the scholars Georg Tannstetter, Stiborius, Thomas Resch, Stefan Rosinus, Johannes Cuspinianus, and the reformer Joachim Vadianus. These humanists were associated with the court of Maximilian I, Holy Roman Emperor.
