= Bottomley projection =

Pseudoconical equal-area map projection

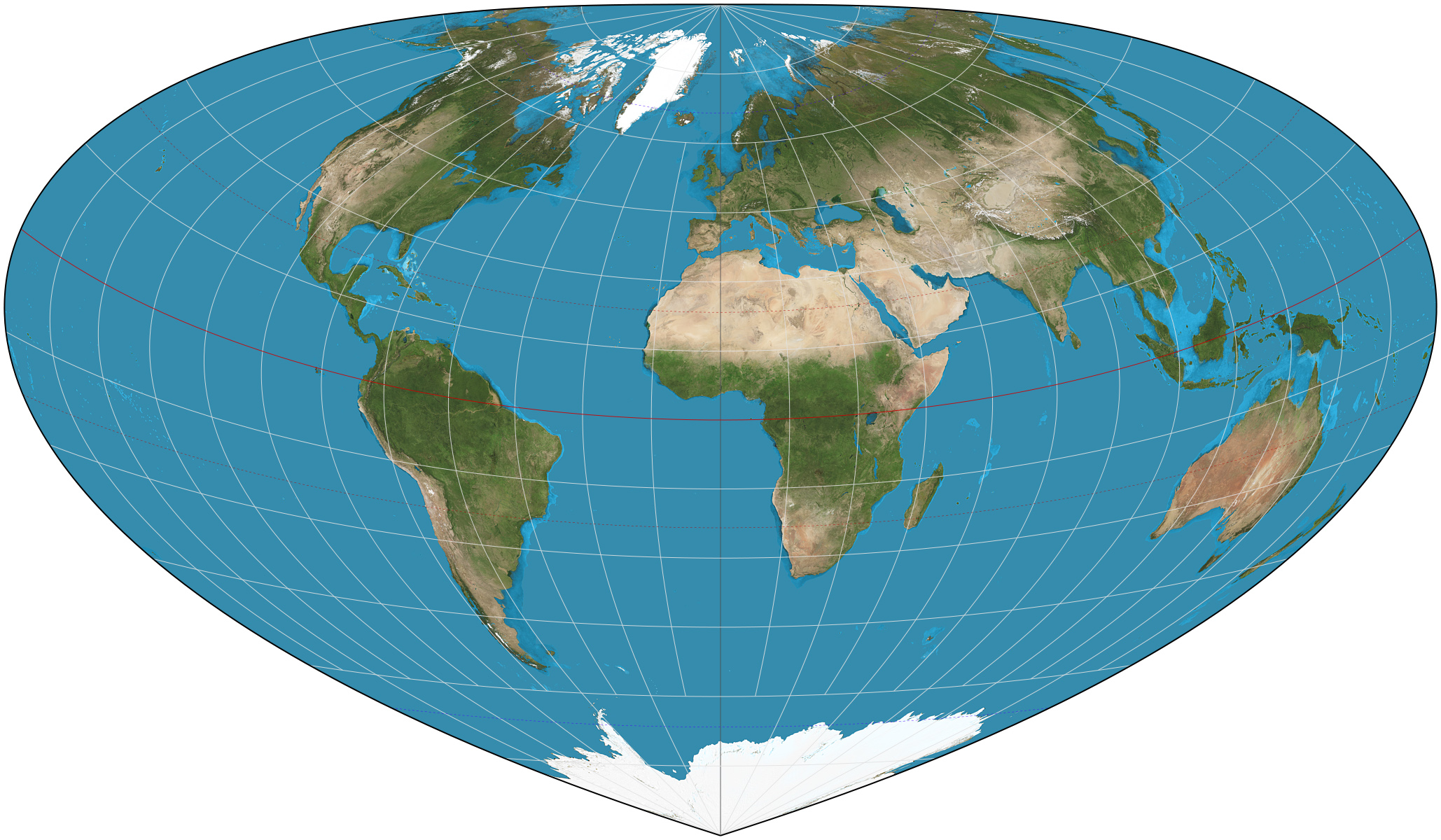
Bottomley projection of the world with standard parallel at 30°N.

The Bottomley map projection is a pseudoconical equal area map projection defined as:
$$x = \frac{\rho \sin E }{ \sin \varphi_1}, \qquad y = \frac{\pi}{2} - \rho \cos E \,$$
where
$$\rho = \frac{\pi}{2} - \varphi, \qquad E = \frac {\lambda \sin \varphi_1 \sin \rho} {\rho}$$
and φ is the latitude, λ is the longitude from the central meridian, and φ_{1} is the given parallel of the projection which determines its shape, all in radians.

The inverse projection is then given by:
$$\begin{align}\varphi &= \frac{\pi}{2} - \rho  \\
\lambda &=\frac{E \rho} {\sin  \varphi_1 \sin \rho} \end{align}$$
where
$$\rho = \sqrt{ (x\sin \varphi_1)^2 + \left(\varphi_1 - y + \cot \varphi_1\right)^2 }, \qquad E= \tan^{-1}\left(\frac{x\sin \varphi_1}{\varphi_1 - y + \cot \varphi_1}\right).$$

Parallels (i.e. lines of latitude) are concentric elliptical arcs of constant eccentricity equal to cos φ_{1}, centred on the North Pole. On the central meridian, shapes are not distorted, but elsewhere they are. Different projections can be produced by altering the eccentricity of the arcs, making it vary between the sinusoidal projection and the Werner projection. For larger values of φ_{1}, it produces a heart shape.

It was introduced by Henry Bottomley as an alternative to the Bonne projection to reduce the extent of extreme distortion at the edges and give a more satisfying overall shape.

== See also ==
- List of map projections
