= Johannes Werner =

German mathematician

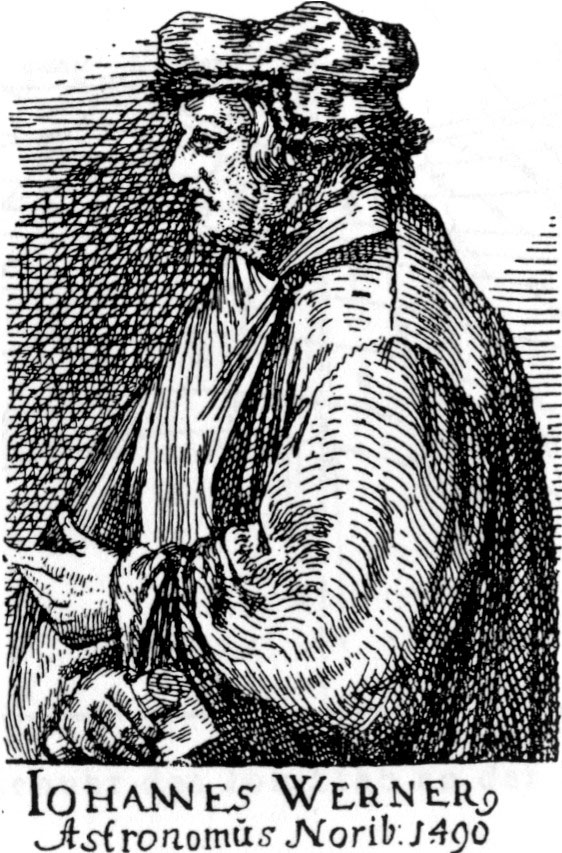
Johannes Werner

Johann(es) Werner (Latin: Ioannes Vernerus; February 14, 1468 – May 1522) was a German mathematician. He was born in Nuremberg, Germany, where he became a parish priest. His primary work was in astronomy, mathematics, and geography, although he was also considered a skilled instrument maker.

== Mathematics ==
His mathematical works were in the areas of spherical trigonometry, as well as conic sections. He published an original work on conic sections in 1522 and is one of several mathematicians sometimes credited with the invention of prosthaphaeresis, which simplifies tedious computations by the use of trigonometric formulas, sometimes called Werner's formulas.

== Astronomy ==
In 1500 he observed a comet, and kept observations of its movements from June 1 until the 24th.

This work further developed the suggestion of Regiomontanus that the occurrences of eclipses and cometary orbits could be used to find longitude, giving a practical approach for this method by means of the cross-staff. (The approach did not actually solve the problem as the instrument was not sufficiently accurate.)

His trepidations method to describe precession of the equinoxes De motu octauæ Sphær was posthumously challenged in 1524 by Nicolaus Copernicus in The Letter against Werner.

== Geography ==
He is most noted for his work, In Hoc Opere Haec Continentur Nova Translatio Primi Libri Geographicae Cl Ptolomaei, published in Nuremberg in 1514, a translation of Claudius Ptolemy's Geography. In it, he refined and promoted the Werner map projection, a cordiform (heart-shape) projection map that had been developed by Johannes Stabius (Stab) of Vienna around 1500. This projection would be used for world maps and some continental maps through the 16th century and into the 17th century. It was used by Mercator, Oronce Fine, and Ortelius in the late 16th century for maps of Asia and Africa. By the 18th century, it was replaced by the Bonne projection for continental maps. The Werner projection is only used today for instructional purposes and as a novelty.

In this work, Werner also proposed an astronomical method to determine longitude, by measuring the position of the moon relative to the background stars. The idea was later discussed in detail by Petrus Apianus in his Cosmographicus liber (Landshut 1524) and became known as the lunar distance method.

== Meteorology ==
Many consider Werner as a pioneer of modern meteorology and weather forecasting. Between 1513 and 1520, Johann Werner made the first regular observations of the weather conditions in Germany.

== Notable publications ==
- In hoc opere haec continentur Nova translatio primi libri geographiae Cl. Ptolomaei: quae quidem translatio verbum: habet e verbo fideliter expressum. Libellus de quattuor terrarum orbis in plano figurationibus.: In idem Georgii Amirucii opusculaum. Appendices, Nürnberg 1514
- In hoc opere haec continentur. Libellvs Ioannis Verneri Nvrembergen. Svper Vigintidvobvs Elementis Conicis. Comentarius seu paraphrastica enarratio in vndecim modos conficiendi eius Problematis quod Cubi duplicatio dicitur. Eivsdem. Comentatio in Dionysodori problema, quo data sphæra plano sub data secat ratione, Alivs modus idem problema coficiendi ab eodem Ioanne Vernero nouissime copertus demostratusq; de motu octauæ Sphæræ, Tractatus duo. Summaria enarratio Theoricæ motus octau Sphæræ., Nürnberg, Petrejus 1522
- De Triangulis sphaericis libri quatuor; De meteoroscopiis libri sex, Leibzig, B.G. Teubner 1907 [written early 16th century].
- Canones sicut breuissimi, ita etiam doctissimi, complectentes praecepta & obseruationes de mutatione aurae, 1546
- Compendiosa institvtio in vniversam dialecticam, ex Aristot., Riuio, aliisque auctoribus recentioribus collecta, nuperrime scholiis philosophicis illustrata

== Honours ==
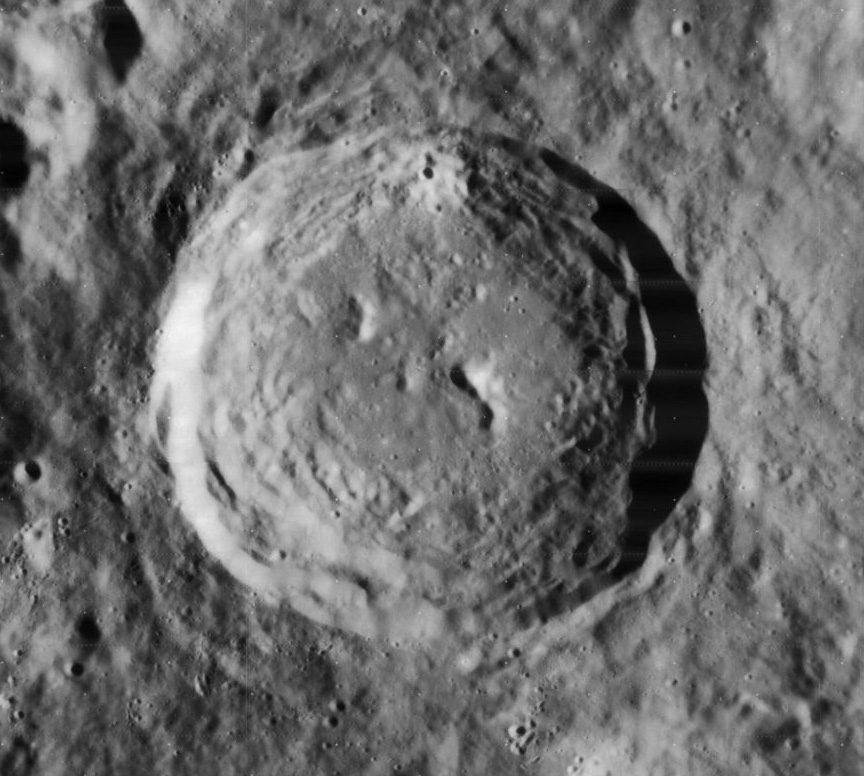
Werner Crater on the moon

The crater Werner on the Moon is named after him.

Some of the trigonometric identities used in prosthaphaeresis, an early method for rapid computation of products, were named Werner formulas in honor of Werner's role in development of the algorithm.

== See also ==
- History of longitude
- Werner projection
- Bonne projection
