= Thomas Resch =

Austrian humanist

Thomas Resch (1460-1520) was an Austrian Renaissance humanist. He went by the Latin name of Thomas Velocianus. He was a member of a circle of humanists based in Vienna. This circle included the scholars Georg Tannstetter, Johannes Stabius, Stiborius, Stefan Rosinus (1470-1548), Johannes Cuspinianus, and the reformer Joachim Vadianus. These humanists were associated with the court of Maximilian I, Holy Roman Emperor.
