= Bonne projection =

Map projection

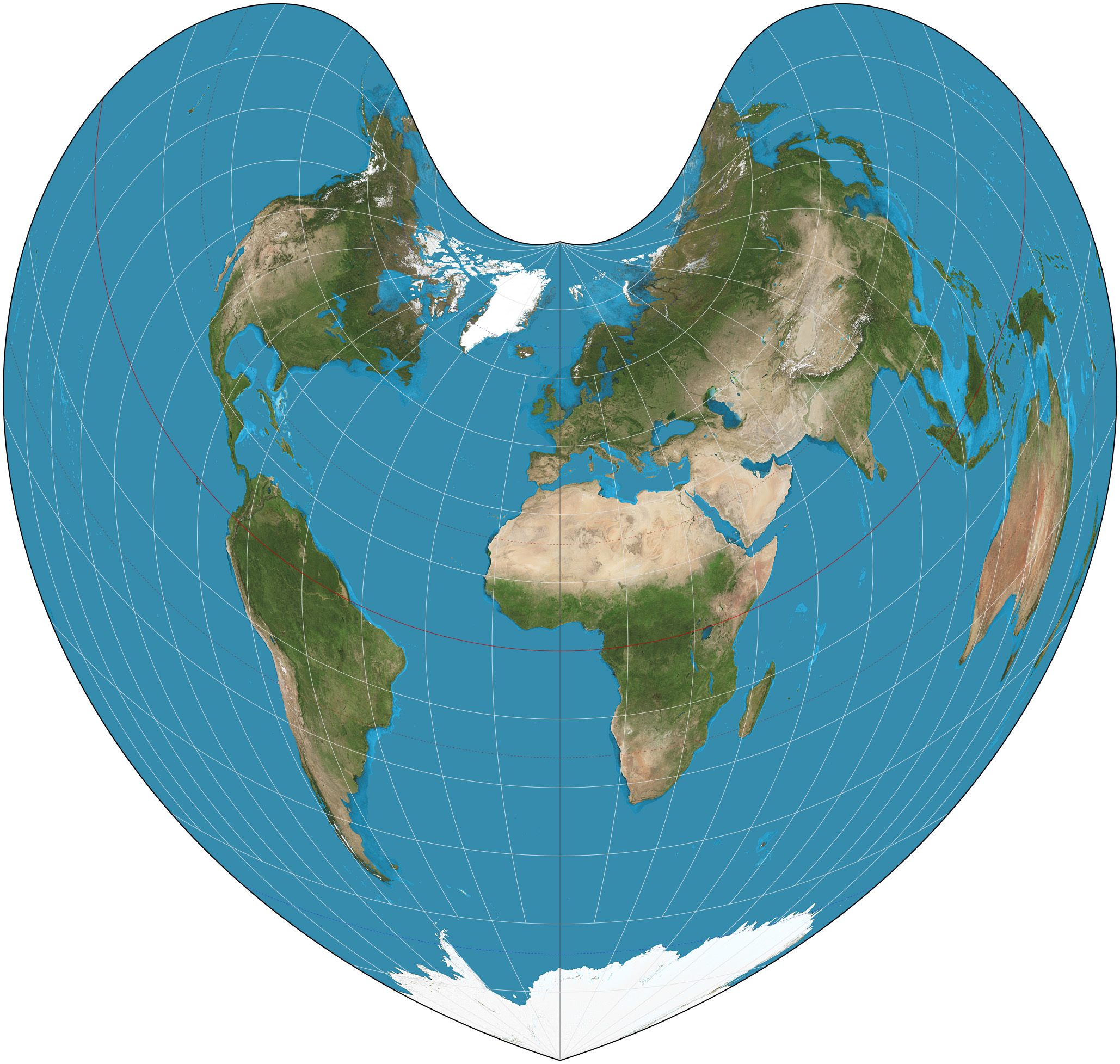
Bonne projection of the world, standard parallel at 45°N.

Bonne projection with Tissot's indicatrix of deformation.

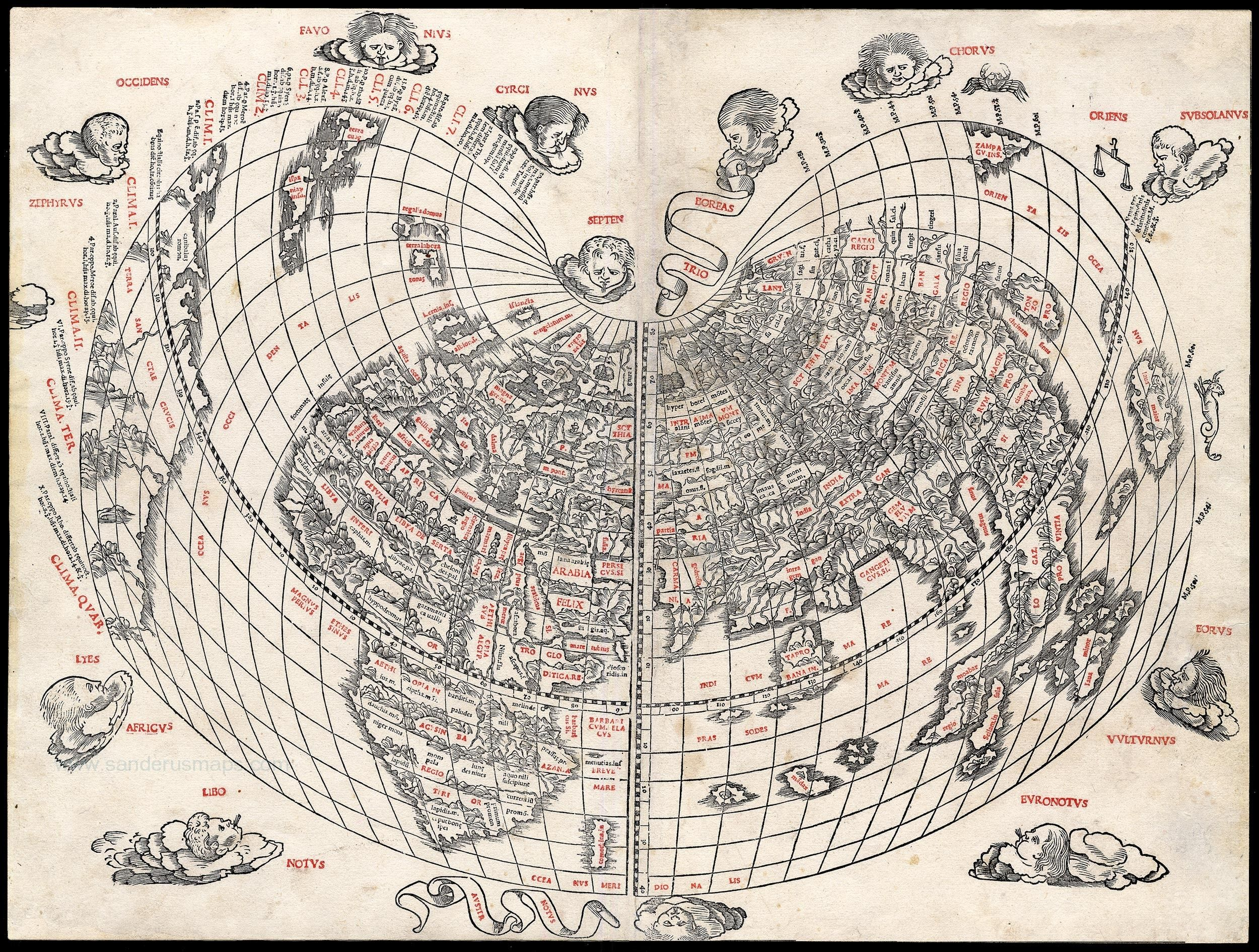
World map by Bernard Sylvanus, 1511

The Bonne projection is a pseudoconical equal-area map projection, sometimes called a dépôt de la guerre, modified Flamsteed, or a Sylvanus projection. Although named after Rigobert Bonne (1727–1795), the projection was in use prior to his birth, by Sylvanus in 1511, Honter in 1561, Coronelli in 1696 and De l'Isle before 1700. Both Sylvanus and Honter's usages were approximate, however, and it is not clear they intended to be the same projection.

The Bonne projection maintains accurate shapes of areas along the central meridian and the standard parallel, but progressively distorts away from those regions. Thus, it best maps "t"-shaped regions. It has been used extensively for maps of Europe and Asia.

The projection is defined as:
$$\begin{align} x &= \rho \sin E \\ y &= \cot \varphi_1 - \rho \cos E\end{align}$$
where
$$\begin{align}\rho &= \cot \varphi_1 + \varphi_1 - \varphi \\ E &= \frac {(\lambda - \lambda_0) \cos \varphi} {\rho}\end{align}$$
and φ is the latitude, λ is the longitude, λ_{0} is the longitude of the central meridian, and φ_{1} is the standard parallel of the projection.

Parallels of latitude are concentric circular arcs, and the scale is true along these arcs. On the central meridian and the standard latitude shapes are not distorted.

The inverse projection is given by:
$$\begin{align}\varphi &= \cot \varphi_1 + \varphi_1 - \rho \\
\lambda &= \lambda_0 + \frac{\rho} {\cos \varphi}  \arctan \left(\frac {x}{ \cot \varphi_1 - y} \right) \end{align}$$
where
$$\rho = \pm \sqrt{ x^2 + \left( \cot \varphi_1 - y\right)^2 }$$
taking the sign of φ_{1}.

Special cases of the Bonne projection include the sinusoidal projection, when φ_{1} is zero (i.e. the Equator), and the Werner projection, when φ_{1} is 90° (i.e. the North or South Pole). The Bonne projection can be seen as an intermediate projection in the unwinding of a Werner projection into a Sinusoidal projection; an alternative intermediate would be a Bottomley projection.

== See also ==
- List of map projections
