= Werner projection =

Method of projecting a sphere to the plane

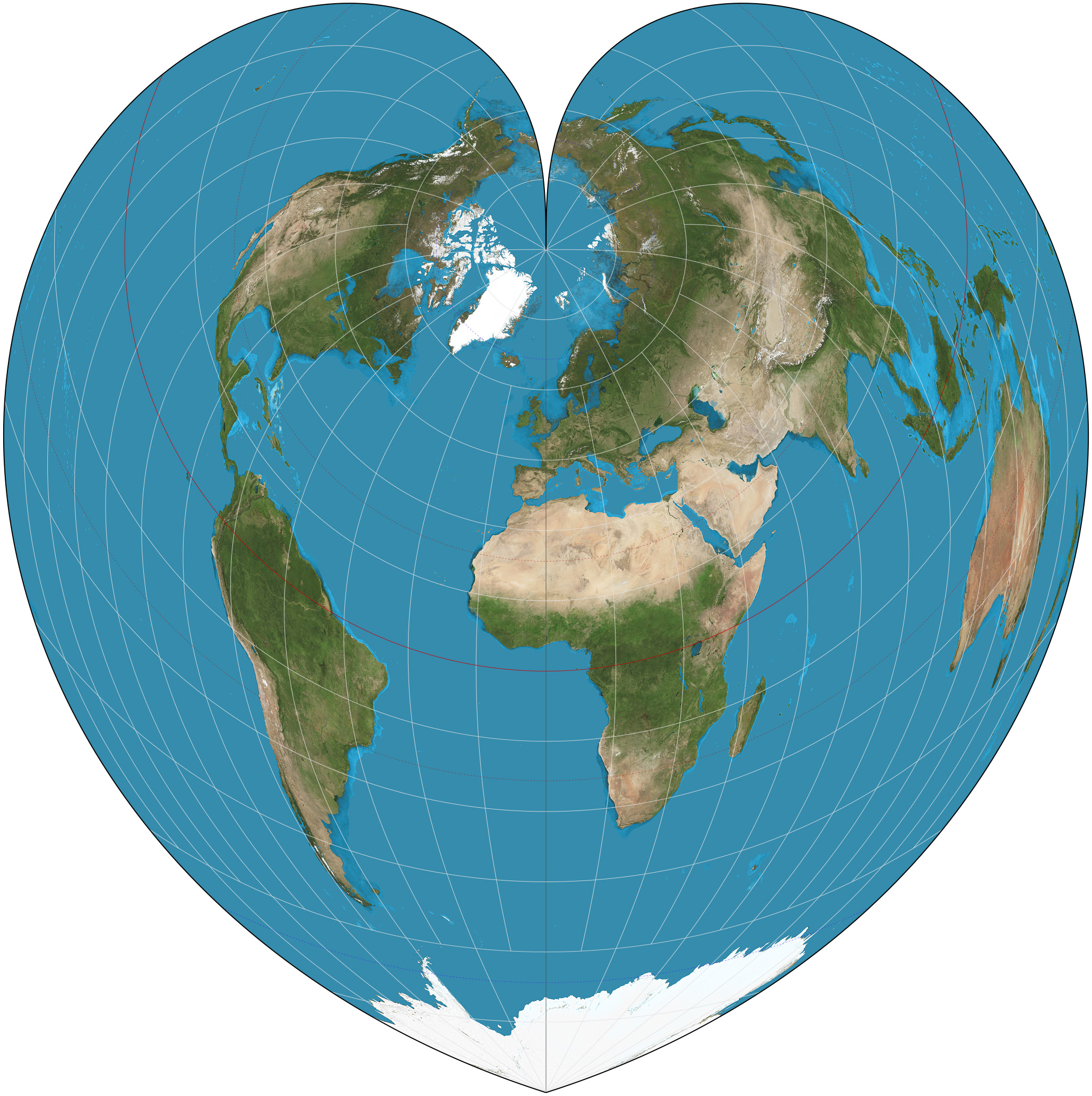
Werner projection of the world

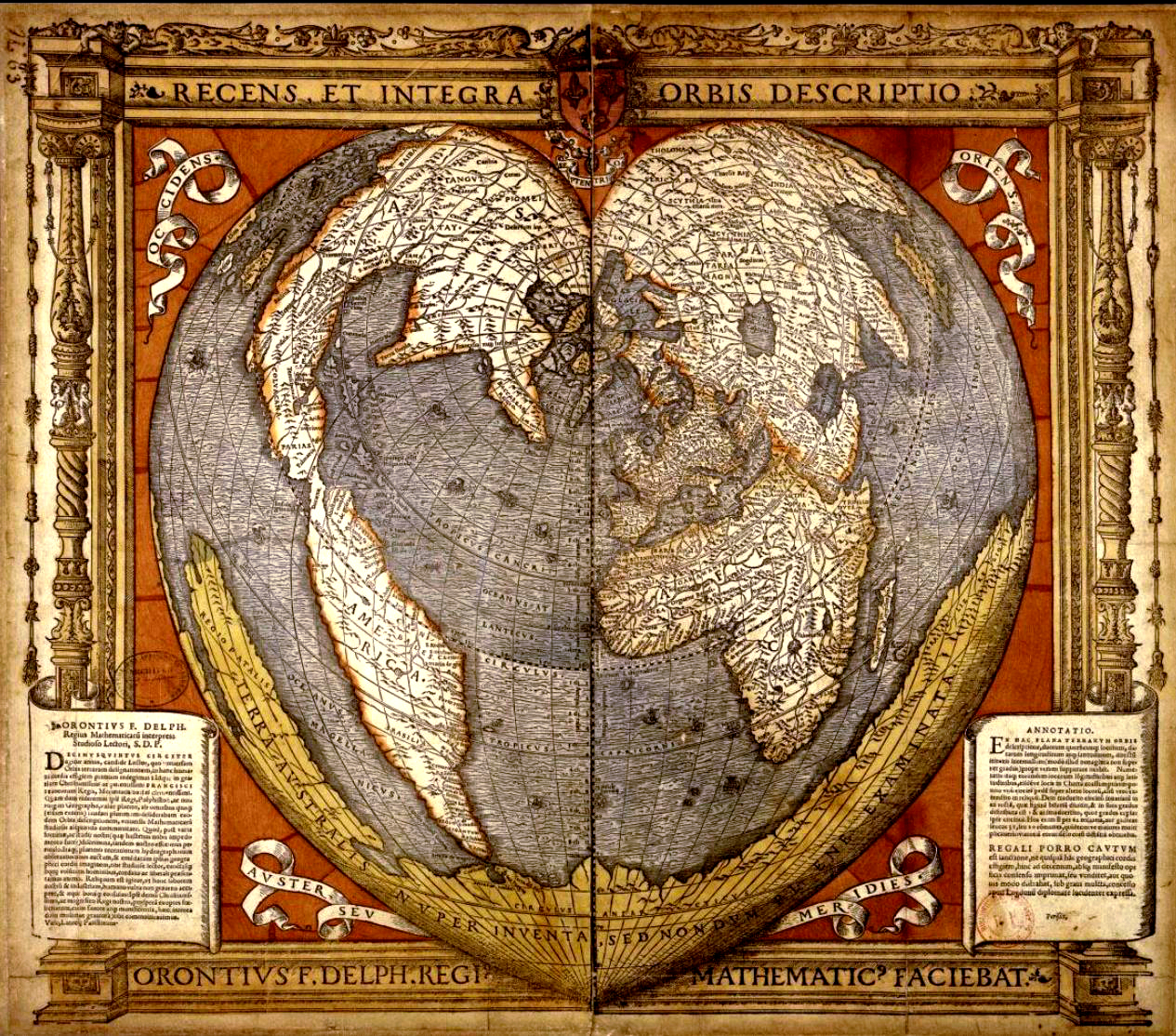
Woodcut from 1536 by Oronce Finé showing the Werner projection

The Werner projection is a pseudoconic equal-area map projection sometimes called the Stab–Werner or Stabius–Werner projection. Like other heart-shaped projections, it is also categorized as cordiform. Stab–Werner refers to two originators: Johannes Werner (1466–1528), a parish priest in Nuremberg, refined and promoted this projection that had been developed earlier by Johannes Stabius (Stab) of Vienna around 1500.

The projection is a limiting form of the Bonne projection, having its standard parallel at one of the poles (90°N/S). Distances along each parallel and along the central meridian are correct, as are all distances from the north pole.

== See also ==
- Cardioid
- List of map projections
